This is an alphabetical list of the 7,918 Italian municipalities (comuni).
These represent the fundamental municipal units of the local government system of the country.

A

 Abano Terme
 Abbadia Cerreto
 Abbadia Lariana
 Abbadia San Salvatore
 Abbasanta
 Abbateggio
 Abbiategrasso
 Abetone
 Abriola
 Acate
 Accadia
 Acceglio
 Accettura
 Acciano
 Accumoli
 Acerenza
 Acerno
 Acerra
 Aci Bonaccorsi
 Aci Castello
 Aci Catena
 Aci Sant'Antonio
 Acireale
 Acquacanina
 Acquafondata
 Acquaformosa
 Acquafredda
 Acqualagna
 Acquanegra Cremonese
 Acquanegra sul Chiese
 Acquapendente
 Acquappesa
 Acquarica del Capo
 Acquaro
 Acquasanta Terme
 Acquasparta
 Acquaviva Collecroce
 Acquaviva delle Fonti
 Acquaviva d'Isernia
 Acquaviva Picena
 Acquaviva Platani
 Acquedolci
 Acqui Terme
 Acri
 Acuto
 Adelfia
 Adrano
 Adrara San Martino
 Adrara San Rocco
 Adria
 Adro
 Affi
 Affile
 Afragola
 Africo
 Agazzano
 Agerola
 Aggius
 Agira
 Agliana
 Agliano Terme
 Agliè
 Aglientu
 Agna
 Agnadello
 Agnana Calabra
 Agnone
 Agnosine
 Agordo
 Agosta
 Agra
 Agrate Brianza
 Agrate Conturbia
 Agrigento
 Agropoli
 Agugliano
 Agugliaro
 Ahrntal
 Aicurzio
 Aidomaggiore
 Aidone
 Aielli
 Aiello Calabro
 Aiello del Friuli
 Aiello del Sabato
 Aieta
 Ailano
 Ailoche
 Airasca
 Airola
 Airole
 Airuno
 Aisone
 Ala
 Alà dei Sardi
 Ala di Stura
 Alagna
 Alagna Valsesia
 Alanno
 Alano di Piave
 Alassio
 Alatri
 Alba
 Alba Adriatica
 Albagiara
 Albairate
 Albanella
 Albano di Lucania
 Albano Laziale
 Albano Sant'Alessandro
 Albano Vercellese
 Albaredo Arnaboldi
 Albaredo d'Adige
 Albaredo per San Marco
 Albareto
 Albaretto della Torre
 Albavilla
 Albenga
 Albera Ligure
 Alberobello
 Alberona
 Albese con Cassano
 Albettone
 Albi
 Albiano
 Albiano d'Ivrea
 Albiate
 Albidona
 Albignasego
 Albinea
 Albino
 Albiolo
 Albisola Superiore
 Albissola Marina
 Albizzate
 Albonese
 Albosaggia
 Albugnano
 Albuzzano
 Alcamo
 Alcara li Fusi
 Aldein
 Aldeno
 Ales
 Alessandria
 Alessandria del Carretto
 Alessandria della Rocca
 Alessano
 Alezio
 Alfano
 Alfedena
 Alfianello
 Alfiano Natta
 Alfonsine
 Alghero
 Algua
 Algund
 Alì
 Alì Terme
 Alia
 Aliano
 Alice Bel Colle
 Alice Castello
 Alice Superiore
 Alife
 Alimena
 Aliminusa
 Allai
 Alleghe
 Allein
 Allerona
 Alliste
 Allumiere
 Alluvioni Cambiò
 Almè
 Almenno San Bartolomeo
 Almenno San Salvatore
 Almese
 Alonte
 Alpette
 Alpignano
 Alseno
 Alserio
 Altamura
 Altare
Alta Val Tidone
 Altavilla Irpina
 Altavilla Milicia
 Altavilla Monferrato
 Altavilla Silentina
 Altavilla Vicentina
 Altidona
 Altilia
 Altino
 Altissimo
 Altivole
 Alto
 Altofonte
 Altomonte
 Altopascio
 Altrei
 Alviano
 Alvignano
 Alvito
 Alzano Lombardo
 Alzano Scrivia
 Alzate Brianza
 Amalfi
 Amandola
 Amantea
 Amaro
 Amaroni
 Amaseno
 Amato
 Amatrice
 Ambivere
 Amblar
 Ameglia
 Amelia
 Amendolara
 Ameno
 Amorosi
 Ampezzo
 Anacapri
 Anagni
 Ancarano
 Ancona
 Andali
 Andalo
 Andalo Valtellino
 Andezeno
 Andora
 Andorno Micca
 Andrano
 Andrate
 Andreis
 Andretta
 Andria
 Andrian
 Anela
 Anfo
 Angera
 Anghiari
 Angiari
 Angolo Terme
 Angri
 Angrogna
 Anguillara Sabazia
 Anguillara Veneta
 Annicco
 Annone di Brianza
 Annone Veneto
 Anoia
 Antegnate
 Antey-Saint-André
 Anticoli Corrado
 Antignano
 Antillo
 Antonimina
 Antrodoco
 Antrona Schieranco
 Anversa degli Abruzzi
 Anzano del Parco
 Anzano di Puglia
 Anzi
 Anzio
 Anzola dell'Emilia
 Anzola d'Ossola
 Aosta
 Apecchio
 Apice
 Apiro
 Apollosa
 Appiano Gentile
 Appignano
 Appignano del Tronto
 Aprica
 Apricale
 Apricena
 Aprigliano
 Aprilia
 Aquara
 Aquila d'Arroscia
 Aquileia
 Aquilonia
 Aquino
 Aradeo
 Aragona
 Aramengo
 Arba
 Arborea
 Arborio
 Arbus
 Arcade
 Arce
 Arcene
 Arcevia
 Archi
 Arcidosso
 Arcinazzo Romano
 Arcisate
 Arco
 Arcola
 Arcole
 Arconate
 Arcore
 Arcugnano
 Ardara
 Ardauli
 Ardea
 Ardenno
 Ardesio
 Ardore
 Arena
 Arena Po
 Arenzano
 Arese
 Arezzo
 Argegno
 Argelato
 Argenta
 Argentera
 Arguello
 Argusto
 Ari
 Ariano Irpino
 Ariano nel Polesine
 Ariccia
 Arielli
 Arienzo
 Arignano
 Aritzo
 Arizzano
 Arlena di Castro
 Arluno
 Armeno
 Armento
 Armo
 Armungia
 Arnad
 Arnara
 Arnasco
 Arnesano
 Arola
 Arona
 Arosio
 Arpaia
 Arpaise
 Arpino
 Arquà Petrarca
 Arquà Polesine
 Arquata del Tronto
 Arquata Scrivia
 Arre
 Arrone
 Arsago Seprio
 Arsiè
 Arsiero
 Arsita
 Arsoli
 Arta Terme
 Artegna
 Artena
 Artogne
 Arvier
 Arzachena
 Arzago d'Adda
 Arzana
 Arzano
 Arzene
 Arzergrande
 Arzignano
 Ascea
 Asciano
 Ascoli Piceno
 Ascoli Satriano
 Ascrea
 Asiago
 Asigliano Veneto
 Asigliano Vercellese
 Asola
 Asolo
 Assago
 Assemini
 Assisi
 Asso
 Assolo
 Assoro
 Asti
 Asuni
 Ateleta
 Atella
 Atena Lucana
 Atessa
 Atina
 Atrani
 Atri
 Atripalda
 Attigliano
 Attimis
 Atzara
 Auer
 Augusta
 Auletta
 Aulla
 Aurano
 Aurigo
 Auronzo di Cadore
 Ausonia
 Austis
 Avegno
 Avella
 Avellino
 Averara
 Aversa
 Avetrana
 Avezzano
 Aviano
 Aviatico
 Avigliana
 Avigliano
 Avigliano Umbro
 Avio
 Avise
 Avola
 Avolasca
 Ayas
 Aymavilles
 Azeglio
 Azzanello
 Azzano d'Asti
 Azzano Decimo
 Azzano Mella
 Azzano San Paolo
 Azzate
 Azzio
 Azzone

B

 Baceno
 Bacoli
 Badalucco
 Badesi
 Badia
 Badia Calavena
 Badia Pavese
 Badia Polesine
 Badia Tedalda
 Badolato
 Bagaladi
 Bagheria
 Bagnacavallo
 Bagnara Calabra
 Bagnara di Romagna
 Bagnaria
 Bagnaria Arsa
 Bagnasco
 Bagnatica
 Bagni di Lucca
 Bagno a Ripoli
 Bagno di Romagna
 Bagnoli del Trigno
 Bagnoli di Sopra
 Bagnoli Irpino
 Bagnolo Cremasco
 Bagnolo del Salento
 Bagnolo di Po
 Bagnolo in Piano
 Bagnolo Mella
 Bagnolo Piemonte
 Bagnolo San Vito
 Bagnone
 Bagnoregio
 Bagolino
 Baia e Latina
 Baiano
 Bairo
 Baiso
 Bajardo
 Balangero
 Baldichieri d'Asti
 Baldissero Canavese
 Baldissero d'Alba
 Baldissero Torinese
 Balestrate
 Balestrino
 Ballabio
 Ballao
 Balme
 Balmuccia
 Balocco
 Balsorano
 Balvano
 Balzola
 Banari
 Banchette
 Bannio Anzino
 Banzi
 Baone
 Baradili
 Baragiano
 Baranello
 Barano d'Ischia
 Baranzate
 Barasso
 Baratili San Pietro
 Barbania
 Barbara
 Barbarano Romano
 Barbarano Vicentino
 Barbaresco
 Barbariga
 Barbata
 Barberino di Mugello
 Barberino Val d'Elsa
 Barbian
 Barbianello
 Barbona
 Barcellona Pozzo di Gotto
 Barchi
 Barcis
 Bard
 Bardello
 Bardi
 Bardineto
 Bardolino
 Bardonecchia
 Bareggio
 Barengo
 Baressa
 Barete
 Barga
 Bargagli
 Barge
 Barghe
 Bari
 Bari Sardo
 Bariano
 Baricella
 Barile
 Barisciano
 Barlassina
 Barletta
 Barni
 Barolo
 Barone Canavese
 Baronissi
 Barrafranca
 Barrali
 Barrea
 Barumini
 Barzago
 Barzana
 Barzanò
 Barzio
 Basaluzzo
 Bascapè
 Baschi
 Basciano
 Baselga di Pinè
 Baselice
 Basiano
 Basicò
 Basiglio
 Basiliano
 Bassano Bresciano
 Bassano del Grappa
 Bassano in Teverina
 Bassano Romano
 Bassiano
 Bassignana
 Bastia Mondovì
 Bastia Umbra 
 Bastida Pancarana
 Bastiglia
 Battaglia Terme
 Battifollo
 Battipaglia
 Battuda
 Baucina
 Bauladu
 Baunei
 Baveno
 Bedero Valcuvia
 Bedizzole
 Bedollo
 Bedonia
 Bedulita
 Bee
 Beinasco
 Beinette
 Belcastro
 Belfiore
 Belforte all'Isauro
 Belforte del Chienti
 Belforte Monferrato
 Belgioioso
 Belgirate
 Bella
 Bellagio
 Bellano
 Bellante
 Bellaria-Igea Marina
 Bellegra
 Bellino
 Bellinzago Lombardo
 Bellinzago Novarese
 Bellizzi
 Bellona
 Bellosguardo
 Belluno
 Bellusco
 Belmonte Calabro
 Belmonte Castello
 Belmonte del Sannio
 Belmonte in Sabina
 Belmonte Mezzagno
 Belmonte Piceno
 Belpasso
 Belsito
 Belvedere di Spinello
 Belvedere Langhe
 Belvedere Marittimo
 Belvedere Ostrense
 Belveglio
 Belvì
 Bema
 Bene Lario
 Bene Vagienna
 Benestare
 Benetutti
 Benevello
 Benevento
 Benna
 Bentivoglio
 Berbenno
 Berbenno di Valtellina
 Berceto
 Berchidda
 Beregazzo con Figliaro
 Bereguardo
 Bergamasco
 Bergamo
 Bergantino
 Bergeggi
 Bergolo
 Berlingo
 Bernalda
 Bernareggio
 Bernate Ticino
 Bernezzo
 Berra
 Bersone
 Bertinoro
 Bertiolo
 Bertonico
 Berzano di San Pietro
 Berzano di Tortona
 Berzo Demo
 Berzo Inferiore
 Berzo San Fermo
 Besana in Brianza
 Besano
 Besate
 Besenello
 Besenzone
 Besnate
 Besozzo
 Bessude
 Bettola
 Bettona
 Beura-Cardezza
 Bevagna
 Beverino
 Bevilacqua
 Bezzecca
 Biancavilla
 Bianchi
 Bianco
 Biandrate
 Biandronno
 Bianzano
 Bianzè
 Bianzone
 Biassono
 Bibbiano
 Bibbiena
 Bibbona
 Bibiana
 Biccari
 Bicinicco
 Bidonì
 Biella
 Bienno
 Bieno
 Bientina
 Bigarello
 Binago
 Binasco
 Binetto
 Bioglio
 Bionaz
 Bione
 Birori
 Bisaccia
 Bisacquino
 Bisceglie
 Bisegna
 Bisenti
 Bisignano
 Bistagno
 Bisuschio
 Bitetto
 Bitonto
 Bitritto
 Bitti
 Bivona
 Bivongi
 Bizzarone
 Bleggio Inferiore
 Bleggio Superiore
 Blello
 Blera
 Blessagno
 Blevio
 Blufi
 Boara Pisani
 Bobbio
 Bobbio Pellice
 Boca
 Bocchigliero
 Boccioleto
 Bocenago
 Bodio Lomnago
 Boffalora d'Adda
 Boffalora sopra Ticino
 Bogliasco
 Bognanco
 Bogogno
 Boissano
 Bojano
 Bolano
 Bolbeno
 Bolgare
 Bollate
 Bollengo
 Bologna
 Bolognano
 Bolognetta
 Bolognola
 Bolotana
 Bolsena
 Boltiere
 Bolzano
 Bolzano Novarese
 Bolzano Vicentino
 Bomarzo
 Bomba
 Bompensiere
 Bompietro
 Bomporto
 Bonarcado
 Bonassola
 Bonate Sopra
 Bonate Sotto
 Bonavigo
 Bondeno
 Bondo
 Bondone
 Bonea
 Bonefro
 Bonemerse
 Bonifati
 Bonito
 Bonnanaro
 Bono
 Bonorva
 Bonvicino
 Borbona
 Borca di Cadore
 Bordano
 Bordighera
 Bordolano
 Bore
 Boretto
 Borgarello
 Borgaro Torinese
 Borgetto
 Borghetto d'Arroscia
 Borghetto di Borbera
 Borghetto di Vara
 Borghetto Lodigiano
 Borghetto Santo Spirito
 Borghi
 Borgia
 Borgiallo
 Borgio Verezzi
 Borgo a Mozzano
 Borgo d'Ale
 Borgo di Terzo
 Borgo Pace
 Borgo Priolo
 Borgo San Dalmazzo
 Borgo San Giacomo
 Borgo San Giovanni
 Borgo San Lorenzo
 Borgo San Martino
 Borgo San Siro
 Borgo Ticino
 Borgo Tossignano
 Borgo Val di Taro
 Borgo Valsugana
 Borgo Velino
 Borgo Vercelli
 Borgoforte
 Borgofranco d'Ivrea
 Borgofranco sul Po
 Borgolavezzaro
 Borgomale
 Borgomanero
 Borgomaro
 Borgomasino
 Borgone Susa
 Borgonovo Val Tidone
 Borgoratto Alessandrino
 Borgoratto Mormorolo
 Borgoricco
 Borgorose
 Borgosatollo
 Borgosesia
 Bormida
 Bormio
 Bornasco
 Borno
 Boroneddu
 Borore
 Borrello
 Borriana
 Borso del Grappa
 Bortigali
 Bortigiadas
 Borutta
 Borzonasca
 Bosa
 Bosaro
 Boschi Sant'Anna
 Bosco Chiesanuova
 Bosco Marengo
 Bosconero
 Boscoreale
 Boscotrecase
 Bosentino
 Bosia
 Bosio
 Bosisio Parini
 Bosnasco
 Bossico
 Bossolasco
 Botricello
 Botrugno
 Bottanuco
 Botticino
 Bottidda
 Bova
 Bova Marina
 Bovalino
 Bovegno
 Boves
 Bovezzo
 Boville Ernica
 Bovino
 Bovisio-Masciago
 Bovolenta
 Bovolone
 Bozzole
 Bozzolo
 Bra
 Bracca
 Bracciano
 Bracigliano
 Brallo di Pregola
 Brancaleone
 Brandico
 Brandizzo
 Branzi
 Braone
 Brebbia
 Breda di Piave
 Bregano
 Breganze
 Bregnano
 Breguzzo
 Breia
 Brembate
 Brembate di Sopra
 Brembilla
 Brembio
 Breme
 Brendola
 Brenna
 Brenner
 Breno
 Brenta
 Brentino Belluno
 Brentonico
 Brenzone
 Brescello
 Brescia
 Bresimo
 Bressana Bottarone
 Bressanvido
 Bresso
 Brez
 Brezzo di Bedero
 Briaglia
 Briatico
 Bricherasio
 Brienno
 Brienza
 Briga Alta
 Briga Novarese
 Brignano Gera d'Adda
 Brignano-Frascata
 Brindisi
 Brindisi Montagna
 Brinzio
 Briona
 Brione (Province of Brescia)
 Brione (Province of Trento)
 Briosco
 Brisighella
 Brissago-Valtravaglia
 Brissogne
 Brittoli
 Brivio
 Brixen
 Broccostella
 Brogliano
 Brognaturo
 Brolo
 Brondello
 Broni
 Bronte
 Bronzolo
 Brossasco
 Brosso
 Brovello-Carpugnino
 Brozolo
 Brugherio
 Brugine
 Brugnato
 Brugnera
 Bruino
 Brumano
 Brunate
 Bruneck
 Brunello
 Bruno
 Brusaporto
 Brusasco
 Brusciano
 Brusimpiano
 Brusnengo
 Brusson
 Bruzolo
 Bruzzano Zeffirio
 Bubbiano
 Bubbio
 Buccheri
 Bucchianico
 Bucciano
 Buccinasco
 Buccino
 Bucine
 Buddusò
 Budoia
 Budoni
 Budrio
 Buggerru
 Buggiano
 Buglio in Monte
 Bugnara
 Buguggiate
 Buja
 Bulciago
 Bulgarograsso
 Bultei
 Bulzi
 Buonabitacolo
 Buonalbergo
 Buonconvento
 Buonvicino
 Burago di Molgora
 Burcei
 Burgio
 Burgos
 Burgstall
 Buriasco
 Burolo
 Buronzo
 Busachi
 Busalla
 Busana
 Busano
 Busca
 Buscate
 Buscemi
 Buseto Palizzolo
 Busnago
 Bussero
 Busseto
 Bussi sul Tirino
 Busso
 Bussolengo
 Bussoleno
 Busto Arsizio
 Busto Garolfo
 Butera
 Buti
 Buttapietra
 Buttigliera Alta
 Buttigliera d'Asti
 Buttrio

C

 Ca' d'Andrea
 Cabella Ligure
 Cabiate
 Cabras
 Caccamo
 Caccuri
 Cadegliano-Viconago
 Cadelbosco di Sopra
 Cadeo
 Caderzone
 Cadoneghe
 Cadorago
 Cadrezzate
 Caerano di San Marco
 Cafasse
 Caggiano
 Cagli
 Cagliari
 Caglio
 Cagnano Amiterno
 Cagnano Varano
 Cagno
 Cagnò
 Caianello
 Caiazzo
 Caino
 Caiolo
 Cairano
 Cairate
 Cairo Montenotte
 Caivano
 Calabritto
 Calalzo di Cadore
 Calamandrana
 Calamonaci
 Calangianus
 Calanna
 Calasca-Castiglione
 Calascibetta
 Calascio
 Calasetta
 Calatabiano
 Calatafimi-Segesta
 Calavino
 Calcata
 Calceranica al Lago
 Calci
 Calciano
 Calcinaia
 Calcinate
 Calcinato
 Calcio
 Calco
 Caldarola
 Calderara di Reno
 Caldes
 Caldiero
 Caldogno
 Caldonazzo
 Calendasco
 Calenzano
 Calestano
 Calice al Cornoviglio
 Calice Ligure
 Calimera
 Calitri
 Calizzano
 Callabiana
 Calliano (Province of Asti)
 Calliano (Province of Trento)
 Calolziocorte
 Calopezzati
 Calosso
 Caloveto
 Caltabellotta
 Caltagirone
 Caltanissetta
 Caltavuturo
 Caltignaga
 Calto
 Caltrano
 Calusco d'Adda
 Caluso
 Calvagese della Riviera
 Calvanico
 Calvatone
 Calvello
 Calvene
 Calvenzano
 Calvera
 Calvi
 Calvi dell'Umbria
 Calvi Risorta
 Calvignano
 Calvignasco
 Calvisano
 Calvizzano
 Camagna Monferrato
 Camaiore
 Camairago
 Camandona
 Camastra
 Cambiago
 Cambiano
 Cambiasca
 Camburzano
 Camerana
 Camerano
 Camerano Casasco
 Camerata Cornello
 Camerata Nuova
 Camerata Picena
 Cameri
 Camerino
 Camerota
 Camigliano
 Camini
 Camino
 Camino al Tagliamento
 Camisano
 Camisano Vicentino
 Cammarata
 Camo
 Camogli
 Campagna
 Campagna Lupia
 Campagnano di Roma
 Campagnatico
 Campagnola Cremasca
 Campagnola Emilia
 Campana
 Camparada
 Campegine
 Campello sul Clitunno
 Campertogno
 Campi Bisenzio
 Campi Salentina
 Campiglia Cervo
 Campiglia dei Berici
 Campiglia Marittima
 Campiglione-Fenile
 Campione d'Italia
 Campitello di Fassa
 Campli
 Campo Calabro
 Campo di Giove
 Campo Ligure
 Campo nell'Elba
 Campo San Martino
 Campobasso
 Campobello di Licata
 Campobello di Mazara
 Campochiaro
 Campodarsego
 Campodenno
 Campodimele
 Campodipietra
 Campodolcino
 Campodoro
 Campofelice di Fitalia
 Campofelice di Roccella
 Campofilone
 Campofiorito
 Campoformido
 Campofranco
 Campogalliano
 Campolattaro
 Campoli Appennino
 Campoli del Monte Taburno
 Campolieto
 Campolongo Maggiore
 Campolongo sul Brenta
 Campolongo Tapogliano
 Campomaggiore
 Campomarino
 Campomorone
 Camponogara
 Campora
 Camporeale
 Camporgiano
 Camporosso
 Camporotondo di Fiastrone
 Camporotondo Etneo
 Camposampiero
 Camposano
 Camposanto
 Campospinoso
 Campotosto
 Camugnano
 Canal San Bovo
 Canale
 Canale d'Agordo
 Canale Monterano
 Canaro
 Canazei
 Cancellara
 Cancello e Arnone
 Canda
 Candela
 Candelo
 Candia Canavese
 Candia Lomellina
 Candiana
 Candida
 Candidoni
 Candiolo
 Canegrate
 Canelli
 Canepina
 Caneva
 Canevino
 Canicattì
 Canicattini Bagni
 Canino
 Canischio
 Canistro
 Canna
 Cannalonga
 Cannara
 Cannero Riviera
 Canneto Pavese
 Canneto sull'Oglio
 Cannobio
 Cannole
 Canolo
 Canonica d'Adda
 Canosa di Puglia
 Canosa Sannita
 Canosio
 Canossa
 Cansano
 Cantagallo
 Cantalice
 Cantalupa
 Cantalupo in Sabina
 Cantalupo Ligure
 Cantalupo nel Sannio
 Cantarana
 Cantello
 Canterano
 Cantiano
 Cantoira
 Cantù
 Canzano
 Canzo
 Caorle
 Caorso
 Capaccio
 Capaci
 Capalbio
 Capannoli
 Capannori
 Capena
 Capergnanica
 Capestrano
 Capiago Intimiano
 Capistrano
 Capistrello
 Capitignano
 Capizzi
 Capizzone
 Capo di Ponte
 Capo d'Orlando
 Capodimonte
 Capodrise
 Capoliveri
 Capolona
 Caponago
 Caporciano
 Caposele
 Capoterra
 Capovalle
 Cappadocia
 Cappella Cantone
 Cappella de' Picenardi
 Cappella Maggiore
 Cappelle sul Tavo
 Capracotta
 Capraia
 Capraia e Limite
 Capralba
 Capranica
 Capranica Prenestina
 Caprarica di Lecce
 Caprarola
 Caprauna
 Caprese Michelangelo
 Caprezzo
 Capri
 Capri Leone
 Capriana
 Capriano del Colle
 Capriata d'Orba
 Capriate San Gervasio
 Capriati a Volturno
 Caprie
 Capriglia Irpina
 Capriglio
 Caprile
 Caprino Bergamasco
 Caprino Veronese
 Capriolo
 Capriva del Friuli
 Capua
 Capurso
 Caraffa del Bianco
 Caraffa di Catanzaro
 Caraglio
 Caramagna Piemonte
 Caramanico Terme 
 Carapelle
 Carapelle Calvisio
 Carasco
 Carassai
 Carate Brianza
 Carate Urio
 Caravaggio
 Caravate
 Caravino
 Caravonica
 Carbognano
 Carbonara al Ticino
 Carbonara di Nola
 Carbonara di Po
 Carbonara Scrivia
 Carbonate
 Carbone
 Carbonera
 Carbonia
 Carcare
 Carceri
 Carcoforo
 Cardano al Campo
 Cardè
 Cardedu
 Cardeto
 Cardinale
 Cardito
 Careggine
 Carema
 Carenno
 Carentino
 Careri
 Caresana
 Caresanablot
 Carezzano
 Carfizzi
 Cargeghe
 Cariati
 Carife
 Carignano
 Carimate
 Carinaro
 Carini
 Carinola
 Carisio
 Carisolo
 Carlantino
 Carlazzo
 Carlentini
 Carlino
 Carloforte
 Carlopoli
 Carmagnola
 Carmiano
 Carmignano
 Carmignano di Brenta
 Carnago
 Carnate
 Carobbio degli Angeli
 Carolei
 Carona
 Caronia
 Caronno Pertusella
 Caronno Varesino
 Carosino
 Carovigno
 Carovilli
 Carpaneto Piacentino
 Carpanzano
 Carpasio
 Carpegna
 Carpenedolo
 Carpeneto
 Carpi
 Carpiano
 Carpignano Salentino
 Carpignano Sesia
 Carpineti
 Carpineto della Nora
 Carpineto Romano
 Carpineto Sinello
 Carpino
 Carpinone
 Carrara
 Carrè
 Carrega Ligure
 Carro
 Carrodano
 Carrosio
 Carrù
 Carsoli
 Cartigliano
 Cartignano
 Cartoceto
 Cartosio
 Cartura
 Carugate
 Carugo
 Carunchio
 Carvico
 Carzano
 Casabona
 Casacalenda
 Casacanditella
 Casagiove
 Casal Cermelli
 Casal di Principe
 Casal Velino
 Casalanguida
 Casalattico
 Casalbeltrame
 Casalbordino
 Casalbore
 Casalborgone
 Casalbuono
 Casalbuttano ed Uniti
 Casalciprano
 Casalduni
 Casale Corte Cerro
 Casale Cremasco-Vidolasco
 Casale di Scodosia
 Casale Litta
 Casale Marittimo
 Casale Monferrato
 Casale sul Sile
 Casalecchio di Reno
 Casaleggio Boiro
 Casaleggio Novara
 Casaleone
 Casaletto Ceredano
 Casaletto di Sopra
 Casaletto Lodigiano
 Casaletto Spartano
 Casaletto Vaprio
 Casalfiumanese
 Casalgrande
 Casalgrasso
 Casalincontrada
 Casalino
 Casalmaggiore
 Casalmaiocco
 Casalmorano
 Casalmoro
 Casalnoceto
 Casalnuovo di Napoli
 Casalnuovo Monterotaro
 Casaloldo
 Casalpusterlengo
 Casalromano
 Casalserugo
 Casaluce
 Casalvecchio di Puglia
 Casalvecchio Siculo
 Casalvieri
 Casalvolone
 Casalzuigno
 Casamarciano
 Casamassima
 Casamicciola Terme
 Casandrino
 Casanova Elvo
 Casanova Lerrone
 Casanova Lonati
 Casape
 Casapesenna
 Casapinta
 Casaprota
 Casapulla
 Casarano
 Casargo
 Casarile
 Casarsa della Delizia
 Casarza Ligure
 Casasco
 Casasco d'Intelvi
 Casatenovo
 Casatisma
 Casavatore
 Casazza
 Cascia
 Casciago
 Casciana Terme
 Cascina
 Cascinette d'Ivrea
 Casei Gerola
 Caselette
 Casella
 Caselle in Pittari
 Caselle Landi
 Caselle Lurani
 Caselle Torinese
 Caserta
 Casier
 Casignana
 Casina
 Casirate d'Adda
 Caslino d'Erba
 Casnate con Bernate
 Casnigo
 Casola di Napoli
 Casola in Lunigiana
 Casola Valsenio
 Casole Bruzio
 Casole d'Elsa
 Casoli
 Casorate Primo
 Casorate Sempione
 Casorezzo
 Casoria
 Casorzo
 Casperia
 Caspoggio
 Cassacco
 Cassago Brianza
 Cassano allo Ionio
 Cassano d'Adda
 Cassano delle Murge
 Cassano Irpino
 Cassano Magnago
 Cassano Spinola
 Cassano Valcuvia
 Cassaro
 Cassiglio
 Cassina de' Pecchi
 Cassina Rizzardi
 Cassina Valsassina
 Cassinasco
 Cassine
 Cassinelle
 Cassinetta di Lugagnano
 Cassino
 Cassola
 Cassolnovo
 Castagnaro
 Castagneto Carducci
 Castagneto Po
 Castagnito
 Castagnole delle Lanze
 Castagnole Monferrato
 Castagnole Piemonte
 Castana
 Castano Primo
 Casteggio
 Castegnato
 Castegnero
 Castel Baronia
 Castel Boglione
 Castel Bolognese
 Castel Campagnano
 Castel Castagna
 Castel Colonna
 Castel Condino
 Castel d'Aiano
 Castel d'Ario
 Castel d'Azzano
 Castel del Giudice
 Castel del Monte
 Castel del Piano
 Castel del Rio
 Castel di Casio
 Castel di Ieri
 Castel di Judica
 Castel di Lama
 Castel di Lucio
 Castel di Sangro
 Castel di Sasso
 Castel di Tora
 Castel Focognano
 Castel Frentano
 Castel Gabbiano
 Castel Gandolfo
 Castel Giorgio
 Castel Goffredo
 Castel Guelfo di Bologna
 Castel Madama
 Castel Maggiore
 Castel Mella
 Castel Morrone
 Castel Ritaldi
 Castel Rocchero
 Castel Rozzone
 Castel San Giorgio
 Castel San Giovanni
 Castel San Lorenzo
 Castel San Niccolò
 Castel San Pietro Romano
 Castel San Pietro Terme
 Castel San Vincenzo
 Castel Sant'Angelo
 Castel Sant'Elia
 Castel Viscardo
 Castel Vittorio
 Castel Volturno
 Castelbaldo
 Castelbelforte
 Castelbellino
 Castelbianco
 Castelbottaccio
 Castelbuono
 Castelcivita
 Castelcovati
 Castelcucco
 Casteldaccia
 Casteldelci
 Casteldelfino
 Casteldidone
 Castelfidardo
 Castelfiorentino
 Castelfondo
 Castelforte
 Castelfranci
 Castelfranco di Sopra
 Castelfranco di Sotto
 Castelfranco Emilia
 Castelfranco in Miscano
 Castelfranco Veneto
 Castelgomberto
 Castelgrande
 Castelguglielmo
 Castelguidone
 Castellabate
 Castellafiume
 Castell'Alfero
 Castellalto
 Castellammare del Golfo
 Castellammare di Stabia
 Castellamonte
 Castellana Grotte
 Castellana Sicula
 Castellaneta
 Castellania
 Castellanza
 Castellar
 Castellar Guidobono
 Castellarano
 Castellaro
 Castell'Arquato
 Castellavazzo
 Castell'Azzara
 Castellazzo Bormida
 Castellazzo Novarese
 Castelleone
 Castelleone di Suasa
 Castellero
 Castelletto Cervo
 Castelletto d'Erro
 Castelletto di Branduzzo
 Castelletto d'Orba
 Castelletto Merli
 Castelletto Molina
 Castelletto Monferrato
 Castelletto sopra Ticino
 Castelletto Stura
 Castelletto Uzzone
 Castelli
 Castelli Calepio
 Castellina in Chianti
 Castellina Marittima
 Castellinaldo
 Castellino del Biferno
 Castellino Tanaro
 Castelliri
 Castello Cabiaglio
 Castello d'Agogna
 Castello d'Argile
 Castello del Matese
 Castello dell'Acqua
 Castello di Annone
 Castello di Brianza
 Castello di Cisterna
 Castello di Godego
 Castello di Serravalle
 Castello Tesino
 Castello-Molina di Fiemme
 Castellucchio
 Castelluccio dei Sauri
 Castelluccio Inferiore
 Castelluccio Superiore
 Castelluccio Valmaggiore
 Castell'Umberto
 Castelmagno
 Castelmarte
 Castelmassa
 Castelmauro
 Castelmezzano
 Castelmola
 Castelnovetto
 Castelnovo Bariano
 Castelnovo del Friuli
 Castelnovo di Sotto
 Castelnovo ne' Monti
 Castelnuovo
 Castelnuovo Belbo
 Castelnuovo Berardenga
 Castelnuovo Bocca d'Adda
 Castelnuovo Bormida
 Castelnuovo Bozzente
 Castelnuovo Calcea
 Castelnuovo Cilento
 Castelnuovo del Garda
 Castelnuovo della Daunia
 Castelnuovo di Ceva
 Castelnuovo di Conza
 Castelnuovo di Farfa
 Castelnuovo di Garfagnana
 Castelnuovo di Porto
 Castelnuovo di Val di Cecina
 Castelnuovo Don Bosco
 Castelnuovo Magra
 Castelnuovo Nigra
 Castelnuovo Parano
 Castelnuovo Rangone
 Castelnuovo Scrivia
 Castelpagano
 Castelpetroso
 Castelpizzuto
 Castelplanio
 Castelpoto
 Castelraimondo
 Castelsantangelo sul Nera
 Castelsaraceno
 Castelsardo
 Castelseprio
 Castelsilano
 Castelspina
 Casteltermini
 Castelveccana
 Castelvecchio Calvisio
 Castelvecchio di Rocca Barbena
 Castelvecchio Subequo
 Castelvenere
 Castelverde
 Castelverrino
 Castelvetere in Val Fortore
 Castelvetere sul Calore
 Castelvetrano
 Castelvetro di Modena
 Castelvetro Piacentino
 Castelvisconti
 Castenaso
 Castenedolo
 Castiadas
 Castiglion Fibocchi
 Castiglion Fiorentino
 Castiglione a Casauria
 Castiglione Chiavarese
 Castiglione Cosentino
 Castiglione d'Adda
 Castiglione dei Pepoli
 Castiglione del Genovesi
 Castiglione del Lago
 Castiglione della Pescaia
 Castiglione delle Stiviere
 Castiglione di Garfagnana
 Castiglione di Sicilia
 Castiglione d'Intelvi
 Castiglione d'Orcia
 Castiglione Falletto
 Castiglione in Teverina
 Castiglione Messer Marino
 Castiglione Messer Raimondo
 Castiglione Olona
 Castiglione Tinella
 Castiglione Torinese
 Castignano
 Castilenti
 Castino
 Castione Andevenno
 Castione della Presolana
 Castions di Strada
 Castiraga Vidardo
 Casto
 Castorano
 Castrezzato
 Castri di Lecce
 Castrignano de' Greci
 Castrignano del Capo
 Castro (Province of Bergamo)
 Castro (Province of Lecce)
 Castro dei Volsci
 Castrocaro Terme e Terra del Sole
 Castrocielo
 Castrofilippo
 Castrolibero
 Castronno
 Castronovo di Sicilia
 Castronuovo di Sant'Andrea
 Castropignano
 Castroreale
 Castroregio
 Castrovillari
 Catania
 Catanzaro
 Catenanuova
 Catignano
 Cattolica
 Cattolica Eraclea
 Caulonia
 Cautano
 Cava de' Tirreni
 Cava Manara
 Cavacurta
 Cavaglià
 Cavaglietto
 Cavaglio d'Agogna
 Cavagnolo
 Cavaion Veronese
 Cavalese
 Cavallasca
 Cavallerleone
 Cavallermaggiore
 Cavallino
 Cavallino-Treporti
 Cavallirio
 Cavareno
 Cavargna
 Cavaria con Premezzo
 Cavarzere
 Cavaso del Tomba
 Cavasso Nuovo
 Cavatore
 Cavazzo Carnico
 Cave
 Cavedago
 Cavedine
 Cavenago d'Adda
 Cavenago di Brianza
 Cavernago
 Cavezzo
 Cavizzana
 Cavour
 Cavriago
 Cavriana
 Cavriglia
 Cazzago Brabbia
 Cazzago San Martino
 Cazzano di Tramigna
 Cazzano Sant'Andrea
 Ceccano
 Cecima
 Cecina
 Cedegolo
 Cedrasco
 Cefalà Diana
 Cefalù
 Ceggia
 Ceglie Messapica
 Celano
 Celenza sul Trigno
 Celenza Valfortore
 Celico
 Cella Dati
 Cella Monte
 Cellamare
 Cellara
 Cellarengo
 Cellatica
 Celle di Bulgheria
 Celle di Macra
 Celle di San Vito
 Celle Enomondo
 Celle Ligure
 Celleno
 Cellere
 Cellino Attanasio
 Cellino San Marco
 Cellio
 Cellole
 Cembra Lisignago
 Cenadi
 Cenate Sopra
 Cenate Sotto
 Cencenighe Agordino
 Cene
 Ceneselli
 Cengio
 Centa San Nicolò
 Centallo
 Cento
 Centola
 Centrache
 Centuripe
 Cepagatti
 Ceppaloni
 Ceppo Morelli
 Ceprano
 Cerami
 Ceranesi
 Cerano
 Cerano d'Intelvi
 Ceranova
 Ceraso
 Cercemaggiore
 Cercenasco
 Cercepiccola
 Cerchiara di Calabria
 Cerchio
 Cercino
 Cercivento
 Cercola
 Cerda
 Cerea
 Ceregnano
 Cerenzia
 Ceres
 Ceresara
 Cereseto
 Ceresole Alba
 Ceresole Reale
 Cerete
 Ceretto Lomellina
 Cergnago
 Ceriale
 Ceriana
 Ceriano Laghetto
 Cerignale
 Cerignola
 Cerisano
 Cermenate
 Cermignano
 Cernobbio
 Cernusco Lombardone
 Cernusco sul Naviglio
 Cerreto Castello
 Cerreto d'Asti
 Cerreto d'Esi
 Cerreto di Spoleto
 Cerreto Grue
 Cerreto Guidi
 Cerreto Laziale
 Cerreto Sannita
 Cerretto Langhe
 Cerrina Monferrato
 Cerrione
 Cerro al Lambro
 Cerro al Volturno
 Cerro Maggiore
 Cerro Tanaro
 Cerro Veronese
 Cersosimo
 Certaldo
 Certosa di Pavia
 Cerva
 Cervara di Roma
 Cervarese Santa Croce
 Cervaro
 Cervasca
 Cervatto
 Cerveno
 Cervere
 Cervesina
 Cerveteri
 Cervia
 Cervicati
 Cervignano d'Adda
 Cervignano del Friuli
 Cervinara
 Cervino
 Cervo
 Cerzeto
 Cesa
 Cesana Brianza
 Cesana Torinese
 Cesano Boscone
 Cesano Maderno
 Cesara
 Cesarò
 Cesate
 Cesena
 Cesenatico
 Cesinali
 Cesio
 Cesiomaggiore
 Cessalto
 Cessaniti
 Cessapalombo
 Cessole
 Cetara
 Ceto
 Cetona
 Cetraro
 Ceva
 Cevo
 Challand-Saint-Anselme
 Challand-Saint-Victor
 Chambave
 Chamois
 Champdepraz
 Champorcher
 Charvensod
 Châtillon
 Cherasco
 Cheremule
 Chialamberto
 Chiampo
 Chianche
 Chianciano Terme
 Chianni
 Chianocco
 Chiaramonte Gulfi
 Chiaramonti
 Chiarano
 Chiaravalle
 Chiaravalle Centrale
 Chiari
 Chiaromonte
 Chiauci
 Chiavari
 Chiavenna
 Chiaverano
 Chieri
 Chies d'Alpago
 Chiesa in Valmalenco
 Chiesanuova
 Chiesina Uzzanese
 Chieti
 Chieuti
 Chieve
 Chignolo d'Isola
 Chignolo Po
 Chioggia
 Chiomonte
 Chions
 Chiopris-Viscone
 Chitignano
 Chiuduno
 Chiuppano
 Chiuro
 Chiusa di Pesio
 Chiusa di San Michele
 Chiusa Sclafani
 Chiusaforte
 Chiusanico
 Chiusano d'Asti
 Chiusano di San Domenico
 Chiusavecchia
 Chiusdino
 Chiusi
 Chiusi della Verna
 Chivasso
 Ciampino
 Cianciana
 Cibiana di Cadore
 Cicagna
 Cicala
 Cicciano
 Cicerale
 Ciciliano
 Cicognolo
 Ciconio
 Cigliano
 Cigliè
 Cigognola
 Cigole
 Cilavegna
 Cimadolmo
 Cimbergo
 Cimego
 Ciminà
 Ciminna
 Cimitile
 Cimolais
 Cimone
 Cinaglio
 Cineto Romano
 Cingia de' Botti
 Cingoli
 Cinigiano
 Cinisello Balsamo
 Cinisi
 Cino
 Cinquefrondi
 Cintano
 Cinte Tesino
 Cinto Caomaggiore
 Cinto Euganeo
 Cinzano
 Ciorlano
 Cipressa
 Circello
 Cirié
 Cirigliano
 Cirimido
 Cirò
 Cirò Marina
 Cis
 Cisano Bergamasco
 Cisano sul Neva
 Ciserano
 Cislago
 Cisliano
 Cismon del Grappa
 Cison di Valmarino
 Cissone
 Cisterna d'Asti
 Cisterna di Latina
 Cisternino
 Citerna
 Città della Pieve
 Città di Castello
 Città Sant'Angelo
 Cittadella
 Cittaducale
 Cittanova
 Cittareale
 Cittiglio
 Civate
 Civenna
 Civezza
 Civezzano
 Civiasco
 Cividale del Friuli
 Cividate al Piano
 Cividate Camuno
 Civita
 Civita Castellana
 Civita d'Antino
 Civitacampomarano
 Civitaluparella
 Civitanova del Sannio
 Civitanova Marche
 Civitaquana
 Civitavecchia
 Civitella Alfedena
 Civitella Casanova
 Civitella d'Agliano
 Civitella del Tronto
 Civitella di Romagna
 Civitella in Val di Chiana
 Civitella Messer Raimondo
 Civitella Paganico
 Civitella Roveto
 Civitella San Paolo
 Civo
 Claino con Osteno
 Claut
 Clauzetto
 Clavesana
 Claviere
 Cles
 Cleto
 Clivio
 Cloz
 Clusone
 Coassolo Torinese
 Coazze
 Coazzolo
 Coccaglio
 Cocconato
 Cocquio-Trevisago
 Cocullo
 Codevigo
 Codevilla
 Codigoro
 Codognè
 Codogno
 Codroipo
 Codrongianos
 Coggiola
 Cogliate
 Cogne
 Cogoleto
 Cogollo del Cengio
 Cogorno
 Colazza
 Colbordolo
 Colere
 Colfelice
 Coli
 Colico
 Collagna
 Collalto Sabino
 Collarmele
 Collazzone
 Colle Brianza
 Colle d'Anchise
 Colle di Tora
 Colle di Val d'Elsa
 Colle San Magno
 Colle Sannita
 Colle Santa Lucia
 Colle Umberto
 Collebeato
 Collecchio
 Collecorvino
 Colledara
 Colledimacine
 Colledimezzo
 Colleferro
 Collegiove
 Collegno
 Collelongo
 Collepardo
 Collepasso
 Collepietro
 Colleretto Castelnuovo
 Colleretto Giacosa
 Collesalvetti
 Collesano
 Colletorto
 Collevecchio
 Colli a Volturno
 Colli del Tronto
 Colli sul Velino
 Colliano
 Collinas
 Collio
 Collobiano
 Colloredo di Monte Albano
 Colmurano
 Colobraro
 Cologna Veneta
 Cologne
 Cologno al Serio
 Cologno Monzese
 Colognola ai Colli
 Colonna
 Colonnella
 Colonno
 Colorina
 Colorno
 Colosimi
 Colturano
 Colzate
 Comabbio
 Comacchio
 Comano
 Comazzo
 Comeglians
 Comelico Superiore
 Comerio
 Comezzano-Cizzago
 Comignago
 Comiso
 Comitini
 Comiziano
 Commessaggio
 Commezzadura
 Como
 Compiano
 Comun Nuovo
 Comunanza
 Cona
 Conca Casale
 Conca dei Marini
 Conca della Campania
 Concamarise
 Concei
 Concerviano
 Concesio
 Conco
 Concordia Sagittaria
 Concordia sulla Secchia
 Concorezzo
 Condino
 Condofuri
 Condove
 Condrò
 Conegliano
 Confienza
 Configni
 Conflenti
 Coniolo
 Conselice
 Conselve
 Consiglio di Rumo
 Contessa Entellina
 Contigliano
 Contrada
 Controguerra
 Controne
 Contursi Terme
 Conversano
 Conza della Campania
 Conzano
 Copertino
 Copiano
 Copparo
 Corana
 Corato
 Corbara
 Corbetta
 Corbola
 Corchiano
 Corciano
 Cordenons
 Cordignano
 Cordovado
 Coredo
 Coreglia Antelminelli
 Coreglia Ligure
 Coreno Ausonio
 Corfinio
 Cori
 Coriano
 Corigliano Calabro
 Corigliano d'Otranto
 Corinaldo
 Corio
 Corleone
 Corleto Monforte
 Corleto Perticara
 Cormano
 Cormons
 Corna Imagna
 Cornalba
 Cornale e Bastida
 Cornaredo
 Cornate d'Adda
 Cornedo Vicentino
 Cornegliano Laudense
 Corneliano d'Alba
 Corniglio
 Corno di Rosazzo
 Corno Giovine
 Cornovecchio
 Cornuda
 Correggio
 Correzzana
 Correzzola
 Corrido
 Corridonia
 Corropoli
 Corsano
 Corsico
 Corsione
 Cortale
 Cortandone
 Cortanze
 Cortazzone
 Corte Brugnatella
 Corte de' Cortesi con Cignone
 Corte de' Frati
 Corte Franca
 Corte Palasio
 Cortemaggiore
 Cortemilia
 Corteno Golgi
 Cortenova
 Cortenuova
 Corteolona
 Cortiglione
 Cortina d'Ampezzo
 Cortino
 Cortona
 Corvara (South Tyrol)
 Corvara (Abruzzo)
 Corvino San Quirico
 Corzano
 Coseano
 Cosenza
 Cosio di Arroscia
 Cosio Valtellino
 Cosoleto
 Cossano Belbo
 Cossano Canavese
 Cossato
 Cosseria
 Cossignano
 Cossogno
 Cossoine
 Cossombrato
 Costa de' Nobili
 Costa di Mezzate
 Costa di Rovigo
 Costa di Serina
 Costa Masnaga
 Costa Valle Imagna
 Costa Vescovato
 Costa Volpino
 Costabissara
 Costacciaro
 Costanzana
 Costarainera
 Costermano
 Costigliole d'Asti
 Costigliole Saluzzo
 Cotignola
 Cotronei
 Cottanello
 Courmayeur
 Covo
 Cozzo
 Craco
 Crandola Valsassina
 Cravagliana
 Cravanzana
 Craveggia
 Creazzo
 Crecchio
 Credaro
 Credera Rubbiano
 Crema
 Cremella
 Cremenaga
 Cremeno
 Cremia
 Cremolino
 Cremona
 Cremosano
 Crescentino
 Crespadoro
 Crespano del Grappa
 Crespellano
 Crespiatica
 Crespina
 Crespino
 Cressa
 Crevacuore
 Crevalcore
 Crevoladossola
 Crispano
 Crispiano
 Crissolo
 Crocefieschi
 Crocetta del Montello
 Crodo
 Crognaleto
 Cropalati
 Cropani
 Crosa
 Crosia
 Crosio della Valle
 Crotone
 Crotta d'Adda
 Crova
 Croviana
 Crucoli
 Cuasso al Monte 
 Cuccaro Vetere
 Cucciago
 Cuceglio
 Cuggiono
 Cugliate-Fabiasco
 Cuglieri
 Cugnoli
 Cumiana
 Cumignano sul Naviglio
 Cunardo
 Cuneo
 Cunevo
 Cunico
 Cuorgnè
 Cupello
 Cupra Marittima
 Cupramontana
 Cura Carpignano
 Curcuris
 Cureggio
 Curiglia con Monteviasco
 Curinga
 Curino
 Curno
 Cursi
 Curtarolo
 Curtatone
 Curti
 Cusago
 Cusano Milanino
 Cusano Mutri
 Cusino
 Cusio
 Custonaci
 Cutigliano
 Cutro
 Cutrofiano
 Cuveglio
 Cuvio

D
 
 Dairago
 Dalmine
 Dambel
 Danta di Cadore
 Daone
 Darè
 Darfo Boario Terme
 Dasà
 Davagna
 Daverio
 Davoli
 Dazio
 Decimomannu
 Decimoputzu
 Decollatura
 Dego
 Deiva Marina
 Delebio
 Delia
 Delianuova
 Deliceto
 Dello
 Demonte
 Denice
 Denno
 Dernice
 Derovere
 Deruta
 Dervio
 Desana
 Desenzano del Garda
 Desio
 Desulo
 Deutschnofen
 Diamante
 Diano Arentino
 Diano Castello
 Diano d'Alba
 Diano Marina
 Diano San Pietro
 Dicomano
 Dignano
 Dimaro
 Dinami
 Dipignano
 Diso
 Divignano
 Dizzasco
 Doberdò del Lago
 Dogliani
 Dogliola
 Dogna
 Dolcè
 Dolceacqua
 Dolcedo
 Dolegna del Collio
 Dolianova
 Dolo
 Dolzago
 Domanico
 Domaso
 Domegge di Cadore
 Domicella
 Domodossola
 Domus de Maria
 Domusnovas
 Don
 Donato
 Dongo
 Donnas
 Donori
 Dorgali
 Dorio
 Dormelletto
 Dorno
 Dorsino
 Dorzano
 Dosolo
 Dossena
 Dosso del Liro
 Doues
 Dovadola
 Dovera
 Dozza
 Dragoni
 Drapia
 Drena
 Drenchia
 Dresano
 Drezzo
 Drizzona
 Dro
 Dronero
 Druento
 Druogno
 Dualchi
 Dubino
 Due Carrare
 Dueville
 Dugenta
 Duino-Aurisina
 Dumenza
 Duno
 Durazzano
 Duronia
 Dusino San Michele

E

 Eboli
 Edolo
 Elice
 Elini
 Ello
 Elmas
 Elva
 Emarèse
 Empoli
 Endine Gaiano
 Enego
 Enemonzo
 Enna
 Entracque
 Entratico
 Envie
 Episcopia
 Eppan an der Weinstraße
 Eraclea
 Erba
 Erbè
 Erbezzo
 Erbusco
 Erchie
 Ercolano
 Erice
 Erli
 Erto e Casso
 Erula
 Erve
 Esanatoglia
 Escalaplano
 Escolca
 Esine
 Esino Lario
 Esperia
 Esporlatu
 Este
 Esterzili
 Etroubles
 Eupilio
 Exilles

F

 Fabbrica Curone
 Fabbriche di Vergemoli
 Fabbrico
 Fabriano
 Fabrica di Roma
 Fabrizia
 Fabro
 Faedis
 Faedo
 Faedo Valtellino
 Faenza
 Faeto
 Fagagna
 Faggeto Lario
 Faggiano
 Fagnano Alto
 Fagnano Castello
 Fagnano Olona
 Fai della Paganella
 Faicchio
 Falcade
 Falciano del Massico
 Falconara Albanese
 Falconara Marittima
 Falcone
 Faleria
 Falerna
 Falerone
 Fallo
 Faloppio
 Falvaterra
 Fanano
 Fanna
 Fano
 Fano Adriano
 Fara Filiorum Petri
 Fara Gera d'Adda
 Fara in Sabina
 Fara Novarese
 Fara Olivana con Sola
 Fara San Martino
 Fara Vicentino
 Fardella
 Farigliano
 Farindola
 Farini
 Farnese
 Farra di Soligo
 Farra d'Isonzo
 Fasano
 Fascia
 Fauglia
 Faule
 Favale di Malvaro
 Favara 
 Favignana
 Favria
 Feisoglio
 Feldthurns
 Feletto
 Felino
 Felitto
 Felizzano
 Feltre
 Fenegrò
 Fenestrelle
 Fénis
 Ferentillo
 Ferentino
 Ferla
 Fermignano
 Fermo
 Ferno
 Feroleto Antico
 Feroleto della Chiesa
 Ferrandina
 Ferrara
 Ferrara di Monte Baldo
 Ferrazzano
 Ferrera di Varese
 Ferrera Erbognone
 Ferrere
 Ferriere
 Ferruzzano
 Fiamignano
 Fiano
 Fiano Romano
 Fiastra
 Fiavè
 Ficarazzi
 Ficarolo
 Ficarra
 Ficulle
 Fidenza
 Fierozzo
 Fiesco
 Fiesole
 Fiesse
 Fiesso d'Artico
 Fiesso Umbertiano
 Figino Serenza
 Figline e Incisa Valdarno
 Figline Vegliaturo
 Filacciano
 Filadelfia
 Filago
 Filandari
 Filattiera
 Filettino
 Filetto
 Filiano
 Filighera
 Filignano
 Filogaso
 Filottrano
 Finale Emilia
 Finale Ligure
 Fino del Monte
 Fino Mornasco
 Fiorano al Serio
 Fiorano Canavese
 Fiorano Modenese
 Fiorenzuola d'Arda
 Firenzuola
 Firmo
 Fiscaglia
 Fisciano
 Fiuggi
 Fiumalbo
 Fiumara
 Fiume Veneto
 Fiumedinisi
 Fiumefreddo Bruzio
 Fiumefreddo di Sicilia
 Fiumicello Villa Vicentina
 Fiumicino
 Fiuminata
 Fivizzano
 Flaibano
 Flero
 Florence
 Floresta
 Floridia
 Florinas
 Flumeri
 Fluminimaggiore
 Flussio
 Fobello
 Foggia
 Foglianise
 Fogliano Redipuglia
 Foglizzo
 Foiano della Chiana
 Foiano di Val Fortore
 Folgaria
 Folignano
 Foligno
 Follina
 Follo
 Follonica
 Fombio
 Fondachelli-Fantina
 Fondi
 Fondo
 Fonni
 Fontainemore
 Fontana Liri
 Fontanafredda
 Fontanarosa
 Fontanelice
 Fontanella
 Fontanellato
 Fontanelle
 Fontaneto d'Agogna
 Fontanetto Po
 Fontanigorda
 Fontanile
 Fontaniva
 Fonte
 Fonte Nuova
 Fontecchio
 Fontechiari
 Fontegreca
 Fonteno
 Fontevivo
 Fonzaso
 Foppolo
 Forano
 Force
 Forchia
 Forcola
 Fordongianus
 Forenza
 Foresto Sparso
 Forgaria nel Friuli
 Forino
 Forio
 Forlì
 Forlì del Sannio
 Forlimpopoli
 Formazza
 Formello
 Formia
 Formicola
 Formigara
 Formigine
 Formigliana
 Fornace
 Fornelli
 Forni Avoltri
 Forni di Sopra
 Forni di Sotto
 Forno Canavese
 Fornovo di Taro
 Fornovo San Giovanni
 Forte dei Marmi
 Fortunago
 Forza d'Agrò
 Fosciandora
 Fosdinovo
 Fossa
 Fossacesia
 Fossalta di Piave
 Fossalta di Portogruaro
 Fossalto
 Fossano
 Fossato di Vico
 Fossato Serralta
 Fossò
 Fossombrone
 Foza
 Frabosa Soprana
 Frabosa Sottana
 Fraconalto
 Fragagnano
 Fragneto l'Abate
 Fragneto Monforte
 Fraine
 Framura
 Francavilla al Mare
 Francavilla Angitola
 Francavilla Bisio
 Francavilla d'Ete
 Francavilla di Sicilia
 Francavilla Fontana
 Francavilla in Sinni
 Francavilla Marittima
 Francica
 Francofonte
 Francolise
 Franzensfeste
 Frascaro
 Frascarolo
 Frascati
 Frascineto
 Frassilongo
 Frassinelle Polesine
 Frassinello Monferrato
 Frassineto Po
 Frassinetto
 Frassino
 Frassinoro
 Frasso Sabino
 Frasso Telesino
 Fratta Polesine
 Fratta Todina
 Frattamaggiore
 Frattaminore
 Fratte Rosa
 Frazzanò
 Fregona
 Freienfeld
 Fresagrandinaria
 Fresonara
 Frigento
 Frignano
 Frinco
 Frisa
 Frisanco
 Front
 Frontino
 Frontone
 Frosinone
 Frosolone
 Frossasco
 Frugarolo
 Fubine Monferrato
 Fucecchio
 Fuipiano Valle Imagna
 Fumane
 Fumone
 Furci
 Furci Siculo
 Furnari
 Furore
 Furtei
 Fuscaldo
 Fusignano
 Fusine
 Futani

G

 Gabbioneta-Binanuova
 Gabiano
 Gabicce Mare
 Gaby
 Gadesco-Pieve Delmona
 Gadoni
 Gaeta
 Gaggi
 Gaggiano
 Gaggio Montano
 Gaglianico
 Gagliano Aterno
 Gagliano Castelferrato
 Gagliano del Capo
 Gagliato
 Gagliole
 Gaiarine
 Gaiba
 Gaiola
 Gaiole in Chianti
 Gairo
 Gais
 Galati Mamertino
 Galatina
 Galatone
 Galatro
 Galbiate
 Galeata
 Galgagnano
 Gallarate
 Gallese
 Galliate
 Galliate Lombardo
 Galliavola
 Gallicano
 Gallicano nel Lazio
 Gallicchio
 Galliera
 Galliera Veneta
 Gallinaro
 Gallio
 Gallipoli
 Gallo Matese
 Gallodoro
 Galluccio
 Galtellì
 Galzignano Terme
 Gamalero
 Gambara
 Gambarana
 Gambasca
 Gambassi Terme
 Gambatesa
 Gambellara
 Gamberale
 Gambettola
 Gambolò
 Gambugliano
 Gandellino
 Gandino
 Gandosso
 Gangi
 Garaguso
 Garbagna
 Garbagna Novarese
 Garbagnate Milanese
 Garbagnate Monastero
 Garda
 Gardone Riviera
 Gardone Val Trompia
 Garessio
 Gargallo
 Gargazon
 Gargnano
 Garlasco
 Garlate
 Garlenda
 Garniga Terme
 Garzeno
 Garzigliana
 Gasperina
 Gassino Torinese
 Gattatico
 Gatteo
 Gattico-Veruno
 Gattinara
 Gavardo
 Gavello
 Gaverina Terme
 Gavi
 Gavignano
 Gavirate
 Gavoi
 Gavorrano
 Gazoldo degli Ippoliti
 Gazzada Schianno
 Gazzaniga
 Gazzo
 Gazzo Veronese
 Gazzola
 Gazzuolo
 Gela
 Gemmano
 Gemona del Friuli
 Gemonio
 Genazzano
 Genga
 Genivolta
 Genoa
 Genola
 Genoni
 Genuri
 Genzano di Lucania
 Genzano di Roma
 Gera Lario
 Gerace
 Geraci Siculo
 Gerano
 Gerenzago
 Gerenzano
 Gergei
 Germagnano
 Germagno
 Germignaga
 Gerocarne
 Gerola Alta
 Gerre de' Caprioli
 Gesico
 Gessate
 Gessopalena
 Gesturi
 Gesualdo
 Ghedi
 Ghemme
 Ghiffa
 Ghilarza
 Ghisalba
 Ghislarengo
 Giacciano con Baruchella
 Giaglione
 Gianico
 Giano dell'Umbria
 Giano Vetusto
 Giardinello
 Giardini Naxos
 Giarole
 Giarratana
 Giarre
 Giave
 Giaveno
 Giavera del Montello
 Giba
 Gibellina
 Gifflenga
 Giffone
 Giffoni Sei Casali
 Giffoni Valle Piana
 Giglio Island
 Gignese
 Gignod
 Gildone
 Gimigliano
 Ginestra
 Ginestra degli Schiavoni
 Ginosa
 Gioi
 Gioia dei Marsi
 Gioia del Colle
 Gioia Sannitica
 Gioia Tauro
 Gioiosa Ionica
 Gioiosa Marea
 Giove
 Giovinazzo
 Giovo
 Girasole
 Girifalco
 Gissi
 Giuggianello
 Giugliano in Campania
 Giuliana
 Giuliano di Roma
 Giuliano Teatino
 Giulianova
 Giungano
 Giurdignano
 Giussago
 Giussano
 Giustenice
 Giustino
 Giusvalla
 Givoletto
 Gizzeria
 Glurns
 Godega di Sant'Urbano
 Godiasco Salice Terme
 Godrano
 Goito
 Golasecca
 Golferenzo
 Golfo Aranci
 Gombito
 Gonars
 Goni
 Gonnesa
 Gonnoscodina
 Gonnosfanadiga
 Gonnosnò
 Gonnostramatza
 Gonzaga
 Gordona
 Gorga
 Gorgo al Monticano
 Gorgoglione
 Gorgonzola
 Goriano Sicoli
 Gorizia
 Gorla Maggiore
 Gorla Minore
 Gorlago
 Gorle
 Gornate-Olona
 Gorno
 Goro
 Gorreto
 Gorzegno
 Gosaldo
 Gossolengo
 Gottasecca
 Gottolengo
 Govone
 Gozzano
 Gradara
 Gradisca d'Isonzo
 Grado
 Gradoli
 Graffignana
 Graffignano
 Graglia
 Gragnano
 Gragnano Trebbiense
 Grammichele
 Grana 
 Granarolo dell'Emilia
 Grandate
 Grandola ed Uniti
 Graniti
 Granozzo con Monticello
 Grantola
 Grantorto
 Granze
 Grassano
 Grassobbio
 Gratteri
 Graun im Vinschgau 
 Gravedona ed Uniti
 Gravellona Lomellina
 Gravellona Toce
 Gravere
 Gravina di Catania
 Gravina in Puglia
 Grazzanise
 Grazzano Badoglio
 Greccio
 Greci
 Greggio
 Gremiasco
 Gressan
 Gressoney-La-Trinité
 Gressoney-Saint-Jean
 Greve in Chianti
 Grezzago
 Grezzana
 Griante
 Gricignano di Aversa
 Grignasco
 Grigno
 Grimacco
 Grimaldi
 Grinzane Cavour
 Grisignano di Zocco
 Grisolia
 Grizzana Morandi
 Grognardo
 Gromo
 Grondona
 Grone
 Grontardo
 Gropello Cairoli
 Gropparello
 Groscavallo
 Grosio
 Grosotto
 Grosseto
 Grosso
 Grottaferrata
 Grottaglie
 Grottaminarda
 Grottammare
 Grottazzolina
 Grotte
 Grotte di Castro
 Grotteria
 Grottole
 Grottolella
 Gruaro
 Grugliasco
 Grumello Cremonese ed Uniti
 Grumello del Monte
 Grumento Nova 
 Grumo Appula
 Grumo Nevano
 Grumolo delle Abbadesse
 Gsies
 Guagnano
 Gualdo
 Gualdo Cattaneo
 Gualdo Tadino
 Gualtieri
 Gualtieri Sicaminò
 Guamaggiore
 Guanzate
 Guarcino
 Guarda Veneta
 Guardabosone
 Guardamiglio
 Guardavalle
 Guardea
 Guardia Lombardi
 Guardia Perticara
 Guardia Piemontese
 Guardia Sanframondi
 Guardiagrele
 Guardialfiera
 Guardiaregia
 Guardistallo
 Guarene
 Guasila
 Guastalla
 Guazzora
 Gubbio
 Gudo Visconti
 Guglionesi
 Guidizzolo
 Guidonia Montecelio
 Guiglia
 Guilmi
 Gurro
 Guspini
 Gussago
 Gussola

H

 Hafling
 Hône

I

 Idro
 Iglesias
 Igliano
 Ilbono
 Illasi
 Illorai
 Imbersago
 Imer
 Imola
 Imperia
 Impruneta
 Inarzo
 Incisa Scapaccino
 Incudine
 Induno Olona
 Ingria
 Innichen
 Intragna
 Introbio
 Introd
 Introdacqua
 Inverigo
 Inverno e Monteleone
 Inverso Pinasca
 Inveruno
 Invorio
 Inzago
 Irgoli
 Irma
 Irsina
 Isasca
 Isca sullo Ionio
 Ischia
 Ischia di Castro
 Ischitella
 Iseo
 Isera
 Isernia
 Isili
 Isnello
 Isola d'Asti
 Isola del Cantone
 Isola del Gran Sasso d'Italia
 Isola del Liri
 Isola del Piano
 Isola della Scala
 Isola delle Femmine
 Isola di Capo Rizzuto
 Isola di Fondra
 Isola Dovarese
 Isola Rizza
 Isola Sant'Antonio
 Isola Vicentina
 Isolabella
 Isolabona
 Isorella
 Ispani
 Ispica
 Ispra
 Issiglio
 Issime
 Isso
 Issogne
 Istrana
 Itala
 Itri
 Ittireddu
 Ittiri
 Ivrea
 Izano

J

 Jacurso
 Jelsi
 Jenesien
 Jenne
 Jerago con Orago
 Jerzu
 Jesi
 Jesolo
 Jolanda di Savoia
 Jonadi
 Joppolo
 Joppolo Giancaxio
 Jovençan

K

 Kaltern an der Weinstraße
 Karneid
 Kastelbell-Tschars
 Kastelruth
 Kiens
 Klausen
 Kuens
 Kurtatsch an der Weinstraße
 Kurtinig an der Weinstraße

L

 La Cassa
 La Loggia
 La Maddalena
 La Magdeleine
 La Morra
 La Salle
 La Spezia
 La Thuile
 La Val
 La Valle Agordina
 La Valletta Brianza
 Laas
 Labico
 Labro
 Lacchiarella
 Lacco Ameno
 Lacedonia
 Laconi
 Ladispoli
 Laerru
 Laganadi
 Laghi
 Laglio
 Lagnasco
 Lago
 Lagonegro
 Lagosanto
 Laigueglia
 Lainate
 Laino
 Laino Borgo
 Laino Castello
 Laives
 Lajatico
 Lajen
 Lallio
 Lama dei Peligni
 Lama Mocogno
 Lambrugo
 Lamezia Terme
 Lamon
 Lampedusa e Linosa
 Lamporecchio
 Lamporo
 Lana
 Lanciano
 Landiona
 Landriano
 Langhirano
 Langosco
 Lanusei
 Lanuvio
 Lanzada 
 Lanzo Torinese
 Lapedona
 Lapio
 Lappano
 L'Aquila
 Larciano
 Lardirago
 Lariano
 Larino
 Las Plassas
 Lascari
 Lasnigo
 Lastebasse
 Lastra a Signa
 Latera
 Laterina Pergine Valdarno
 Laterza
 Latiano
 Latina
 Latisana
 Latronico
 Latsch
 Lattarico
 Lauco
 Laureana Cilento
 Laureana di Borrello
 Laurein
 Laurenzana
 Lauria
 Lauriano
 Laurino
 Laurito
 Lauro
 Lavagna
 Lavagno
 Lavarone
 Lavello
 Lavena Ponte Tresa
 Laveno-Mombello
 Lavenone
 Laviano
 Lavis
 Lazise
 Lazzate
 Lecce
 Lecce nei Marsi
 Lecco
 Ledro
 Leffe
 Leggiuno
 Legnago
 Legnano
 Legnaro
 Lei
 Leinì
 Leivi
 Lemie
 Lendinara
 Leni
 Lenna
 Leno
 Lenola
 Lenta
 Lentate sul Seveso
 Lentella
 Lentiai
 Lentini
 Leonessa
 Leonforte
 Leporano
 Lequile
 Lequio Berria
 Lequio Tanaro
 Lercara Friddi
 Lerici
 Lerma
 Lesa
 Lesegno
 Lesignano de' Bagni
 Lesina
 Lesmo
 Lessolo
 Lessona
 Lestizza
 Letino
 Letojanni
 Lettere
 Lettomanoppello
 Lettopalena
 Levanto
 Levate
 Leverano
 Levice
 Levico Terme
 Levone
 Lezzeno
 Liberi
 Librizzi
 Licata
 Licciana Nardi
 Licenza
 Licodia Eubea
 Lierna
 Lignana
 Lignano Sabbiadoro
 Lillianes
 Limana
 Limatola
 Limbadi
 Limbiate
 Limena
 Limido Comasco
 Limina
 Limone Piemonte
 Limone sul Garda
 Limosano
 Linarolo
 Linguaglossa
 Lioni
 Lipari
 Lipomo
 Lirio
 Liscate
 Liscia
 Lisciano Niccone 
 Lisio
 Lissone
 Liveri
 Livigno
 Livinallongo del Col di Lana
 Livo (Province of Como)
 Livo (Province of Trento)
 Livorno
 Livorno Ferraris
 Livraga
 Lizzanello
 Lizzano
 Lizzano in Belvedere
 Loano
 Loazzolo
 Locana
 Locate di Triulzi
 Locate Varesino
 Locatello
 Loceri
 Locorotondo
 Locri
 Loculi
 Lodè
 Lodi
 Lodi Vecchio
 Lodine
 Lodrino
 Lograto
 Loiano
 Loiri Porto San Paolo
 Lomagna
 Lomazzo
 Lombardore
 Lombriasco
 Lomello
 Lona-Lases
 Lonate Ceppino
 Lonate Pozzolo
 Lonato del Garda
 Londa
 Longano
 Longare
 Longarone
 Longhena
 Longi
 Longiano
 Longobardi
 Longobucco
 Longone al Segrino
 Longone Sabino
 Lonigo
 Loranzè
 Loreggia
 Loreglia
 Lorenzago di Cadore
 Loreo
 Loreto
 Loreto Aprutino
 Loria
 Loro Ciuffenna
 Loro Piceno
 Lorsica
 Losine
 Lotzorai
 Lovere
 Lovero
 Lozio
 Lozza
 Lozzo Atestino
 Lozzo di Cadore
 Lozzolo
 Lu e Cuccaro Monferrato
 Lubriano
 Lucca
 Lucca Sicula
 Lucera
 Lucignano
 Lucinasco
 Lucito
 Luco dei Marsi
 Lucoli
 Lugagnano Val d'Arda
 Lugnano in Teverina
 Lugo
 Lugo di Vicenza
 Luino
 Luisago
 Lula
 Lumarzo
 Lumezzane
 Lunamatrona
 Lunano
 Lungavilla
 Lungro
 Luni
 Luogosano
 Luogosanto
 Lupara
 Lurago d'Erba
 Lurago Marinone
 Lurano
 Luras
 Lurate Caccivio
 Lusciano
 Lüsen
 Luserna
 Luserna San Giovanni
 Lusernetta
 Lusevera
 Lusia
 Lusiana
 Lusigliè
 Lustra
 Luvinate
 Luzzana
 Luzzara
 Luzzi

M

 Maccagno con Pino e Veddasca
 Maccastorna
 Macchia d'Isernia
 Macchia Valfortore
 Macchiagodena
 Macello
 Macerata
 Macerata Campania
 Macerata Feltria
 Macherio
 Maclodio
 Macomer
 Macra
 Macugnaga
 Maddaloni
 Madesimo
 Madignano
 Madone
 Madonna del Sasso
 Madruzzo
 Maenza
 Mafalda
 Magasa
 Magenta
 Maggiora
 Magherno
 Magione
 Magisano
 Magliano Alfieri
 Magliano Alpi
 Magliano de' Marsi
 Magliano di Tenna
 Magliano in Toscana
 Magliano Romano
 Magliano Sabina
 Magliano Vetere
 Maglie
 Magliolo
 Maglione
 Magnacavallo
 Magnago
 Magnano
 Magnano in Riviera
 Magomadas
 Magreglio
 Maida
 Maierà
 Maierato
 Maiolati Spontini
 Maiolo
 Maiori
 Mairago
 Mairano
 Maissana
 Majano
 Malagnino
 Malalbergo
 Malborghetto Valbruna
 Malcesine
 Malè
 Malegno
 Maleo
 Malesco
 Maletto
 Malfa
 Malgesso
 Malgrate
 Malito
 Mallare
 Malnate
 Malo
 Malonno
 Malosco
 Mals
 Maltignano
 Malvagna
 Malvicino
 Malvito
 Mammola
 Mamoiada
 Manciano
 Mandanici
 Mandas
 Mandatoriccio
 Mandela
 Mandello del Lario
 Mandello Vitta
 Manduria
 Manerba del Garda
 Manerbio
 Manfredonia
 Mango
 Mangone
 Maniace
 Maniago
 Manocalzati
 Manoppello
 Mansuè
 Manta
 Mantello
 Mantua
 Manzano
 Manziana
 Mapello
 Mappano
 Mara
 Maracalagonis
 Maranello
 Marano di Napoli
 Marano di Valpolicella
 Marano Equo
 Marano Lagunare
 Marano Marchesato
 Marano Principato
 Marano sul Panaro
 Marano Ticino
 Marano Vicentino
 Maranzana
 Maratea
 Marcallo con Casone
 Marcaria
 Marcedusa
 Marcellina
 Marcellinara
 Marcetelli
 Marcheno
 Marchirolo
 Marciana
 Marciana Marina
 Marcianise
 Marciano della Chiana
 Marcignago
 Marcon
 Marene
 Mareno di Piave
 Marentino
 Mareo
 Maretto
 Margarita
 Margherita di Savoia
 Margno
 Margreid an der Weinstraße
 Mariana Mantovana
 Mariano Comense
 Mariano del Friuli
 Marianopoli
 Mariglianella
 Marigliano
 Marina di Gioiosa Ionica
 Marineo
 Marino
 Marliana
 Marling
 Marmentino
 Marmirolo
 Marmora
 Marnate
 Marone
 Maropati
 Marostica
 Marradi
 Marrubiu
 Marsaglia
 Marsala
 Marsciano
 Marsico Nuovo
 Marsicovetere
 Marta
 Martano
 Martell
 Martellago
 Martignacco
 Martignana di Po
 Martignano
 Martina Franca
 Martinengo
 Martiniana Po
 Martinsicuro
 Martirano
 Martirano Lombardo
 Martis
 Martone
 Marudo
 Maruggio
 Marzabotto
 Marzano
 Marzano Appio
 Marzano di Nola
 Marzi
 Marzio
 Masainas
 Masate
 Mascali
 Mascalucia
 Maschito
 Masciago Primo
 Maser
 Masera
 Maserà di Padova
 Maserada sul Piave
 Masi
 Masi Torello
 Masio
 Maslianico
 Mason Vicentino
 Masone
 Massa
 Massa d'Albe
 Massa di Somma
 Massa e Cozzile
 Massa Fermana 
 Massa Lombarda
 Massa Lubrense
 Massa Marittima
 Massa Martana
 Massafra
 Massalengo
 Massanzago
 Massarosa
 Massazza
 Massello
 Masserano
 Massignano
 Massimeno
 Massimino
 Massino Visconti
 Massiola
 Masullas
 Matelica
 Matera
 Mathi
 Matino
 Matrice
 Mattie
 Mattinata
 Mazara del Vallo
 Mazzano
 Mazzano Romano
 Mazzarino
 Mazzarrà Sant'Andrea
 Mazzarrone
 Mazzè
 Mazzin
 Mazzo di Valtellina
 Meana di Susa
 Meana Sardo
 Meda
 Mede
 Medea
 Medesano
 Medicina
 Mediglia
 Medolago
 Medole
 Medolla
 Meduna di Livenza
 Meduno
 Megliadino San Vitale
 Meina
 Mel
 Melara
 Melazzo
 Meldola
 Mele
 Melegnano
 Melendugno
 Meleti
 Melfi
 Melicuccà
 Melicucco
 Melilli
 Melissa
 Melissano
 Melito di Napoli
 Melito di Porto Salvo
 Melito Irpino
 Melizzano
 Melle
 Mello
 Melpignano
 Melzo
 Menaggio
 Menconico
 Mendatica
 Mendicino
 Menfi
 Mentana
 Meolo
 Merana
 Merano
 Merate
 Mercallo
 Mercatello sul Metauro
 Mercatino Conca
 Mercato San Severino
 Mercato Saraceno
 Mercenasco
 Mercogliano
 Mereto di Tomba
 Mergo
 Mergozzo
 Merì
 Merlara
 Merlino
 Merone
 Mesagne
 Mese
 Mesenzana
 Mesero
 Mesola
 Mesoraca
 Messina
 Mestrino
 Meta
 Mezzago
 Mezzana
 Mezzana Bigli
 Mezzana Mortigliengo
 Mezzana Rabattone
 Mezzane di Sotto
 Mezzanego
 Mezzanino
 Mezzano
 Mezzenile
 Mezzocorona
 Mezzojuso
 Mezzoldo
 Mezzolombardo
 Mezzomerico
 Miagliano
 Miane
 Miasino
 Miazzina
 Micigliano
 Miggiano
 Miglianico  
 Miglierina
 Miglionico
 Mignanego
 Mignano Monte Lungo
 Milan
 Milazzo
 Milena
 Mileto
 Milis
 Militello in Val di Catania
 Militello Rosmarino
 Millesimo
 Milo
 Milzano
 Mineo
 Minerbe
 Minerbio
 Minervino di Lecce
 Minervino Murge
 Minori
 Minturno
 Minucciano
 Mioglia
 Mira
 Mirabella Eclano
 Mirabella Imbaccari
 Mirabello Monferrato
 Mirabello Sannitico
 Miradolo Terme
 Miranda
 Mirandola
 Mirano
 Mirto
 Misano Adriatico
 Misano di Gera d'Adda
 Misilmeri
 Misinto
 Missaglia
 Missanello
 Misterbianco
 Mistretta
 Moasca
 Mocònesi
 Modena
 Modica
 Modigliana
 Modolo
 Modugno
 Moena
 Moggio
 Moggio Udinese
 Moglia
 Mogliano
 Mogliano Veneto
 Mogorella
 Mogoro
 Moiano
 Moimacco
 Moio de' Calvi
 Moio della Civitella
 Moiola
 Mojo Alcantara
 Mola di Bari
 Molare
 Molazzana
 Molfetta
 Molina Aterno 
 Molinara
 Molinella
 Molini di Triora
 Molino dei Torti
 Molise
 Moliterno
 Mollia
 Molochio
 Mölten
 Molteno
 Moltrasio
 Molvena
 Molveno
 Mombaldone
 Mombarcaro
 Mombaroccio
 Mombaruzzo
 Mombasiglio
 Mombello di Torino
 Mombello Monferrato
 Mombercelli
 Momo
 Mompantero
 Mompeo
 Momperone
 Monacilioni
 Monale
 Monasterace
 Monastero Bormida
 Monastero di Lanzo
 Monastero di Vasco
 Monasterolo Casotto
 Monasterolo del Castello
 Monasterolo di Savigliano
 Monastier di Treviso
 Monastir
 Moncalieri
 Moncalvo
 Moncenisio
 Moncestino
 Monchiero
 Monchio delle Corti
 Moncrivello
 Moncucco Torinese
 Mondaino
 Mondavio
 Mondolfo
 Mondovì
 Mondragone
 Moneglia
 Monesiglio
 Monfalcone
 Monforte d'Alba
 Monforte San Giorgio
 Monfumo
 Mongardino
 Monghidoro
 Mongiana
 Mongiardino Ligure
 Mongiuffi Melia
 Mongrando
 Mongrassano
 Monguzzo
 Moniga del Garda
 Monleale
 Monno
 Monopoli
 Monreale
 Monrupino
 Monsampietro Morico
 Monsampolo del Tronto
 Monsano
 Monselice
 Monserrato
 Monsummano Terme
 Montà
 Montabone
 Montacuto
 Montafia
 Montagano
 Montagna in Valtellina
 Montagnana
 Montagnareale 
 Montaguto
 Montaione
 Montalbano Elicona
 Montalbano Jonico
 Montalcino
 Montaldeo
 Montaldo Bormida
 Montaldo di Mondovì
 Montaldo Roero
 Montaldo Scarampi
 Montaldo Torinese
 Montale
 Montalenghe
 Montallegro
 Montalto delle Marche
 Montalto di Castro
 Montalto Dora
 Montalto Carpasio
 Montalto Pavese
 Montalto Uffugo
 Montan
 Montanaro
 Montanaso Lombardo
 Montanera
 Montano Antilia
 Montano Lucino
 Montappone
 Montaquila
 Montasola
 Montauro
 Montazzoli
 Monte Argentario
 Monte Castello di Vibio
 Monte Cavallo
 Monte Cerignone
 Monte Compatri
 Monte Cremasco
 Monte di Malo
 Monte di Procida
 Monte Giberto
 Monte Grimano
 Monte Isola
 Monte Marenzo
 Monte Porzio
 Monte Porzio Catone
 Monte Rinaldo
 Monte Roberto
 Monte Romano
 Monte San Biagio
 Monte San Giacomo
 Monte San Giovanni Campano
 Monte San Giovanni in Sabina
 Monte San Giusto
 Monte San Martino
 Monte San Pietrangeli
 Monte San Pietro
 Monte San Savino
 Monte San Vito
 Monte Santa Maria Tiberina
 Monte Sant'Angelo
 Monte Urano
 Monte Vidon Combatte
 Monte Vidon Corrado
 Montebello della Battaglia
 Montebello di Bertona
 Montebello Ionico
 Montebello sul Sangro
 Montebello Vicentino
 Montebelluna
 Montebruno
 Montebuono
 Montecalvo in Foglia
 Montecalvo Irpino
 Montecalvo Versiggia
 Montecarlo
 Montecarotto
 Montecassiano
 Montecastello
 Montecastrilli
 Montecatini Terme
 Montecatini Val di Cecina
 Montecchia di Crosara
 Montecchio
 Montecchio Emilia
 Montecchio Maggiore
 Montecchio Precalcino
 Montechiaro d'Acqui
 Montechiaro d'Asti
 Montechiarugolo
 Monteciccardo
 Montecilfone
 Montecopiolo
 Montecorice
 Montecorvino Pugliano
 Montecorvino Rovella
 Montecosaro
 Montecrestese
 Montecreto
 Montedinove
 Montedoro
 Montefalcione
 Montefalco
 Montefalcone Appennino
 Montefalcone di Val Fortore
 Montefalcone nel Sannio
 Montefano
 Montefelcino
 Monteferrante
 Montefiascone
 Montefino
 Montefiore Conca
 Montefiore dell'Aso
 Montefiorino
 Monteflavio
 Monteforte Cilento
 Monteforte d'Alpone
 Monteforte Irpino
 Montefortino
 Montefranco
 Montefredane
 Montefusco
 Montegabbione
 Montegalda
 Montegaldella
 Montegallo
 Montegioco
 Montegiordano
 Montegiorgio
 Montegranaro
 Montegridolfo
 Montegrino Valtravaglia
 Montegrosso d'Asti
 Montegrosso Pian Latte
 Montegrotto Terme
 Monteiasi
 Montelabbate
 Montelanico
 Montelapiano
 Monteleone di Fermo
 Monteleone di Puglia
 Monteleone di Spoleto
 Monteleone d'Orvieto
 Monteleone Rocca Doria
 Monteleone Sabino
 Montelepre
 Montelibretti
 Montella
 Montello
 Montelongo
 Montelparo
 Montelupo Albese
 Montelupo Fiorentino
 Montelupone
 Montemaggiore Belsito
 Montemagno
 Montemale di Cuneo
 Montemarano
 Montemarciano
 Montemarzino
 Montemesola
 Montemezzo
 Montemignaio
 Montemiletto
 Montemilone
 Montemitro
 Montemonaco
 Montemurlo
 Montemurro
 Montenars
 Montenero di Bisaccia
 Montenero Sabino
 Montenero Val Cocchiara
 Montenerodomo
 Monteodorisio
 Montepaone
 Monteparano
 Monteprandone
 Montepulciano
 Monterchi
 Montereale
 Montereale Valcellina
 Monterenzio
 Monteriggioni
 Monteroduni
 Monteroni d'Arbia
 Monteroni di Lecce
 Monterosi
 Monterosso al Mare
 Monterosso Almo
 Monterosso Calabro
 Monterosso Grana
 Monterotondo
 Monterotondo Marittimo
 Monterubbiano
 Montesano Salentino
 Montesano sulla Marcellana
 Montesarchio
 Montescaglioso
 Montescano
 Montescheno
 Montescudaio
 Montescudo-Monte Colombo
 Montese
 Montesegale
 Montesilvano
 Montespertoli
 Monteu da Po
 Monteu Roero
 Montevago
 Montevarchi
 Montevecchia 
 Monteverde
 Monteverdi Marittimo
 Monteviale
 Montezemolo
 Monti
 Montiano
 Monticelli Brusati
 Monticelli d'Ongina
 Monticelli Pavese
 Monticello Brianza
 Monticello Conte Otto
 Monticello d'Alba
 Montichiari
 Monticiano
 Montieri
 Montiglio Monferrato
 Montignoso
 Montirone
 Montjovet
 Montodine
 Montoggio
 Montone
 Montopoli di Sabina
 Montopoli in Val d'Arno
 Montorfano
 Montorio al Vomano
 Montorio nei Frentani
 Montorio Romano
 Montoro
 Montorso Vicentino
 Montottone
 Montresta
 Montù Beccaria
 Monvalle
 Monza
 Monzambano
 Monzuno
 Moos in Passeier
 Morano Calabro
 Morano sul Po
 Moransengo
 Moraro
 Morazzone
 Morbegno
 Morbello
 Morciano di Leuca
 Morciano di Romagna
 Morcone
 Mordano
 Morengo
 Mores
 Moresco
 Moretta
 Morfasso
 Morgano
 Morgex
 Morgongiori
 Mori
 Moriago della Battaglia
 Moricone
 Morigerati
 Morimondo
 Morino
 Moriondo Torinese
 Morlupo
 Mormanno
 Mornago
 Mornese
 Mornico al Serio
 Mornico Losana
 Morolo
 Morozzo
 Morra De Sanctis
 Morro d'Alba
 Morro d'Oro
 Morro Reatino
 Morrone del Sannio
 Morrovalle
 Morsano al Tagliamento
 Morsasco
 Mortara
 Mortegliano
 Morterone
 Moruzzo
 Moscazzano
 Moschiano
 Mosciano Sant'Angelo
 Moscufo
 Mossa
 Motta Baluffi
 Motta Camastra
 Motta d'Affermo
 Motta de' Conti
 Motta di Livenza
 Motta Montecorvino
 Motta San Giovanni
 Motta Santa Lucia
 Motta Sant'Anastasia
 Motta Visconti
 Mottafollone
 Mottalciata
 Motteggiana
 Mottola
 Mozzagrogna
 Mozzanica
 Mozzate
 Mozzecane
 Mozzo
 Muccia
 Muggia
 Muggiò
 Mugnano del Cardinale
 Mugnano di Napoli
 Mühlbach
 Mühlwald
 Mulazzano
 Mulazzo
 Mura
 Muravera
 Murazzano
 Murello
 Murialdo
 Murisengo
 Murlo
 Muro Leccese
 Muro Lucano
 Muros
 Muscoline
 Musei
 Musile di Piave
 Musso
 Mussolente
 Mussomeli
 Muzzana del Turgnano
 Muzzano

N

 Nago-Torbole
 Nals
 Nanto
 Naples
 Narbolia
 Narcao
 Nardò
 Nardodipace
 Narni
 Naro
 Narzole
 Nasino
 Naso
 Naturns
 Natz-Schabs
 Nave
 Navelli
 Nazzano
 Ne
 Nebbiuno
 Negrar
 Neirone
 Neive
 Nembro
 Nemi
 Nemoli
 Neoneli
 Nepi
 Nereto
 Nerola
 Nervesa della Battaglia
 Nerviano
 Nespolo
 Nesso
 Netro
 Nettuno
 Neumarkt
 Neviano
 Neviano degli Arduini
 Neviglie
 Niardo
 Nibbiola
 Nibionno
 Nichelino
 Nicolosi
 Nicorvo
 Nicosia
 Nicotera
 Niederdorf
 Niella Belbo
 Niella Tanaro
 Nimis
 Niscemi
 Nissoria
 Nizza di Sicilia
 Nizza Monferrato
 Noale
 Noasca
 Nocara
 Nocciano
 Nocera Inferiore
 Nocera Superiore
 Nocera Terinese
 Nocera Umbra
 Noceto
 Noci
 Nociglia
 Noepoli
 Nogara
 Nogaredo
 Nogarole Rocca
 Nogarole Vicentino
 Noicattaro
 Nola
 Nole
 Noli
 Nomaglio
 Nomi
 Nonantola
 None
 Nonio
 Noragugume
 Norbello
 Norcia
 Norma
 Nosate
 Notaresco
 Noto
 Nova Milanese
 Nova Siri
 Novafeltria
 Novaledo
 Novalesa
 Novara
 Novara di Sicilia
 Novate Mezzola
 Novate Milanese
 Nove
 Novedrate
 Novellara
 Novello
 Noventa di Piave
 Noventa Padovana
 Noventa Vicentina
 Novi di Modena
 Novi Ligure
 Novi Velia
 Noviglio
 Novoli
 Nucetto
 Nughedu San Nicolò
 Nughedu Santa Vittoria
 Nule
 Nulvi
 Numana
 Nuoro
 Nurachi
 Nuragus
 Nurallao
 Nuraminis
 Nureci
 Nurri
 Nus
 Nusco
 Nuvolento
 Nuvolera
 Nuxis

O

 Occhieppo Inferiore
 Occhieppo Superiore
 Occhiobello
 Occimiano
 Ocre
 Odalengo Grande
 Odalengo Piccolo
 Oderzo
 Odolo
 Ofena
 Offagna
 Offanengo
 Offida
 Offlaga
 Oggebbio
 Oggiona con Santo Stefano
 Oggiono
 Oglianico
 Ogliastro Cilento
 Olang
 Olbia
 Olcenengo
 Oldenico
 Oleggio
 Oleggio Castello
 Olevano di Lomellina
 Olevano Romano
 Olevano sul Tusciano
 Olgiate Comasco
 Olgiate Molgora
 Olgiate Olona
 Olginate
 Oliena
 Oliva Gessi
 Olivadi
 Oliveri
 Oliveto Citra
 Oliveto Lario
 Oliveto Lucano
 Olivetta San Michele
 Olivola
 Ollastra
 Ollolai
 Ollomont
 Olmedo
 Olmeneta
 Olmo al Brembo
 Olmo Gentile
 Oltre il Colle
 Oltressenda Alta
 Oltrona di San Mamette
 Olzai
 Ome
 Omegna
 Omignano
 Onanì
 Onano
 Oncino
 Oneta
 Onifai
 Oniferi
 Ono San Pietro
 Onore
 Onzo
 Opera
 Opi
 Oppeano
 Oppido Lucano
 Oppido Mamertina
 Orani
 Oratino
 Orbassano
 Orbetello
 Orciano Pisano
 Orco Feglino
 Ordona
 Orero
 Orgiano
 Orgosolo
 Oria
 Oricola
 Origgio
 Orino
 Orio al Serio
 Orio Canavese
 Orio Litta
 Oriolo
 Oriolo Romano
 Oristano
 Ormea
 Ormelle
 Ornago
 Ornavasso
 Ornica
 Orosei
 Orotelli
 Orria
 Orroli
 Orsago
 Orsara Bormida
 Orsara di Puglia
 Orsenigo
 Orsogna
 Orsomarso
 Orta di Atella
 Orta Nova
 Orta San Giulio
 Ortacesus
 Orte
 Ortelle
 Ortezzano
 Ortignano Raggiolo
 Ortona
 Ortona dei Marsi
 Ortovero
 Ortucchio
 Ortueri
 Orune
 Orvieto
 Orvinio
 Orzinuovi
 Orzivecchi
 Osasco
 Osasio
 Oschiri
 Osidda
 Osiglia
 Osilo
 Osimo
 Osini
 Osio Sopra
 Osio Sotto
 Osnago
 Osoppo
 Ospedaletti
 Ospedaletto
 Ospedaletto d'Alpinolo
 Ospedaletto Euganeo
 Ospedaletto Lodigiano
 Ospitale di Cadore
 Ospitaletto
 Ossago Lodigiano
 Ossana
 Ossi
 Ossimo
 Ossona
 Ostana
 Ostellato
 Ostiano
 Ostiglia
 Ostra
 Ostra Vetere
 Ostuni
 Otranto
 Otricoli
 Ottana
 Ottati
 Ottaviano
 Ottiglio
 Ottobiano
 Ottone
 Oulx
 Ovada
 Ovaro
 Oviglio
 Ovindoli
 Ovodda
 Oyace
 Ozegna
 Ozieri
 Ozzano dell'Emilia
 Ozzano Monferrato
 Ozzero

P

 Pabillonis
 Pace del Mela
 Paceco
 Pacentro
 Pachino
 Paciano
 Padenghe sul Garda
 Paderna
 Paderno d'Adda
 Paderno del Grappa
 Paderno Dugnano
 Paderno Franciacorta
 Paderno Ponchielli
 Padria
 Padru
 Padua
 Padula
 Paduli
 Paesana
 Paese
 Pagani
 Paganico Sabino
 Pagazzano
 Pagliara
 Paglieta
 Pagnacco
 Pagno
 Pagnona
 Pago del Vallo di Lauro
 Pago Veiano
 Paisco Loveno
 Paitone
 Paladina
 Palagano
 Palagianello
 Palagiano
 Palagonia
 Palaia
 Palanzano
 Palata
 Palau
 Palazzago
 Palazzo Adriano
 Palazzo Canavese
 Palazzo Pignano
 Palazzo San Gervasio
 Palazzolo Acreide
 Palazzolo dello Stella
 Palazzolo sull'Oglio
 Palazzolo Vercellese
 Palazzuolo sul Senio
 Palena
 Palermiti
 Palermo
 Palestrina
 Palestro
 Paliano
 Palizzi
 Pallagorio
 Pallanzeno
 Pallare
 Palma Campania
 Palma di Montechiaro
 Palmanova
 Palmariggi
 Palmas Arborea
 Palmi
 Palmiano
 Palmoli
 Palo del Colle
 Palombara Sabina
 Palombaro
 Palomonte
 Palosco
 Palù
 Palù del Fersina
 Paludi
 Paluzza
 Pamparato
 Pancalieri
 Pancarana
 Panchià
 Pandino
 Panettieri
 Panicale
 Pannarano
 Panni
 Pantelleria
 Pantigliate
 Paola
 Paolisi
 Papasidero
 Papozze
 Parabiago
 Parabita
 Paratico
 Parella
 Parenti
 Parete
 Pareto
 Parghelia
 Parlasco
 Parma
 Parodi Ligure
 Paroldo
 Parolise
 Parona
 Parrano
 Parre
 Partanna
 Partinico
 Partschins
 Paruzzaro
 Parzanica
 Pasian di Prato
 Pasiano di Pordenone
 Paspardo
 Passerano Marmorito
 Passignano sul Trasimeno
 Passirano
 Pastena
 Pastorano
 Pastrengo
 Pasturana
 Pasturo
 Paterno
 Paternò
 Paterno Calabro
 Paternopoli
 Patrica
 Pattada
 Patti
 Patù
 Pau
 Paularo
 Pauli Arbarei
 Paulilatino
 Paullo
 Paupisi
 Pavarolo
 Pavia
 Pavia di Udine
 Pavone Canavese
 Pavone del Mella
 Pavullo nel Frignano
 Pazzano
 Peccioli
 Pecetto di Valenza
 Pecetto Torinese
 Pedara
 Pedaso
 Pedavena
 Pedemonte
 Pederobba
 Pedesina
 Pedivigliano
 Pedrengo
 Peglio (Province of Como)
 Peglio (Province of Pesaro and Urbino)
 Pegognaga
 Peia
 Peio
 Pelago
 Pella
 Pellegrino Parmense
 Pellezzano 
 Pellizzano
 Pelugo
 Penango
 Penna in Teverina
 Penna San Giovanni
 Penna Sant'Andrea
 Pennabilli
 Pennadomo
 Pennapiedimonte
 Penne
 Pentone
 Perano
 Perarolo di Cadore
 Percha
 Percile
 Perdasdefogu
 Perdaxius
 Perdifumo
 Pereto
 Perfugas
 Pergine Valsugana
 Pergola
 Perinaldo
 Perito
 Perledo
 Perletto
 Perlo
 Perloz
 Pernumia
 Pero
 Perosa Argentina
 Perosa Canavese
 Perrero
 Persico Dosimo
 Pertengo
 Pertica Alta
 Pertica Bassa
 Pertosa
 Pertusio
 Perugia
 Pesaro
 Pescaglia
 Pescantina
 Pescara
 Pescarolo ed Uniti
 Pescasseroli
 Pescate
 Pesche
 Peschici
 Peschiera Borromeo
 Peschiera del Garda
 Pescia
 Pescina
 Pesco Sannita
 Pescocostanzo
 Pescolanciano
 Pescopagano
 Pescopennataro
 Pescorocchiano
 Pescosansonesco
 Pescosolido
 Pessano con Bornago
 Pessina Cremonese
 Pessinetto
 Petacciato
 Petilia Policastro
 Petina
 Petralia Soprana
 Petralia Sottana
 Petrella Salto
 Petrella Tifernina
 Petriano
 Petriolo
 Petritoli
 Petrizzi
 Petronà
 Petrosino
 Petruro Irpino
 Pettenasco
 Pettinengo
 Pettineo
 Pettoranello del Molise
 Pettorano sul Gizio
 Pettorazza Grimani
 Peveragno
 Pezzana
 Pezzaze
 Pezzolo Valle Uzzone
 Pfalzen
 Pfitsch
 Piacenza
 Piacenza d'Adige
 Piadena Drizzona
 Piaggine
 Pian Camuno
 Piana Crixia
 Piana degli Albanesi
 Piana di Monte Verna
 Piancastagnaio
 Piancogno
 Piandimeleto
 Piane Crati
 Pianella
 Pianello del Lario
 Pianello Val Tidone
 Pianengo
 Pianezza
 Pianezze
 Pianfei
 Pianico
 Pianiga
 Piano di Sorrento
 Pianopoli
 Pianoro
 Piansano
 Piantedo
 Piario
 Piasco
 Piateda
 Piatto
 Piazza al Serchio
 Piazza Armerina
 Piazza Brembana
 Piazzatorre
 Piazzola sul Brenta
 Piazzolo
 Picciano
 Picerno
 Picinisco
 Pico
 Piea
 Piedicavallo
 Piedimonte Etneo
 Piedimonte Matese
 Piedimonte San Germano
 Piedimulera
 Piegaro
 Pienza
 Pieranica
 Pietra de' Giorgi
 Pietra Ligure
 Pietra Marazzi
 Pietrabbondante
 Pietrabruna
 Pietracamela
 Pietracatella
 Pietracupa
 Pietradefusi
 Pietraferrazzana
 Pietrafitta
 Pietragalla
 Pietralunga
 Pietramelara
 Pietramontecorvino
 Pietranico
 Pietrapaola
 Pietrapertosa
 Pietraperzia
 Pietraporzio
 Pietraroja
 Pietrarubbia
 Pietrasanta
 Pietrastornina
 Pietravairano
 Pietrelcina
 Pieve a Nievole
 Pieve Albignola
 Pieve del Cairo
 Pieve di Bono-Prezzo
 Pieve di Cadore
 Pieve di Cento
 Pieve di Soligo
 Pieve di Teco
 Pieve d'Olmi
 Pieve Emanuele
 Pieve Fissiraga
 Pieve Fosciana
 Pieve Ligure
 Pieve Porto Morone
 Pieve San Giacomo
 Pieve Santo Stefano
 Pieve Tesino
 Pieve Torina
 Pieve Vergonte
 Pievepelago
 Piglio
 Pigna
 Pignataro Interamna
 Pignataro Maggiore
 Pignola
 Pignone
 Pigra
 Pila
 Pimentel
 Pimonte
 Pinarolo Po
 Pinasca
 Pincara
 Pinerolo
 Pineto
 Pino d'Asti
 Pino Torinese
 Pinzano al Tagliamento
 Pinzolo
 Piobbico
 Piobesi d'Alba
 Piobesi Torinese
 Piode
 Pioltello
 Piombino
 Piombino Dese
 Pioraco
 Piossasco
 Piovà Massaia
 Piove di Sacco
 Piovene Rocchette 
 Piozzano
 Piozzo
 Piraino
 Pisa
 Pisano
 Piscina
 Piscinas
 Pisciotta
 Pisogne
 Pisoniano
 Pisticci
 Pistoia
 Pitigliano
 Piubega
 Piuro
 Piverone
 Pizzale
 Pizzighettone
 Pizzo
 Pizzoferrato
 Pizzoli
 Pizzone
 Pizzoni
 Placanica
 Plataci
 Platania
 Platì
 Plaus
 Plesio
 Ploaghe
 Plodio
 Pocapaglia
 Pocenia
 Podenzana
 Podenzano
 Pofi
 Poggiardo
 Poggibonsi
 Poggio a Caiano
 Poggio Torriana
 Poggio Bustone
 Poggio Catino
 Poggio Imperiale
 Poggio Mirteto
 Poggio Moiano
 Poggio Nativo
 Poggio Picenze
 Poggio Renatico
 Poggio Rusco
 Poggio San Lorenzo
 Poggio San Marcello
 Poggio San Vicino
 Poggio Sannita
 Poggiodomo
 Poggiofiorito
 Poggiomarino
 Poggioreale
 Poggiorsini
 Poggiridenti
 Pogliano Milanese
 Pognana Lario
 Pognano
 Pogno
 Poirino
 Pojana Maggiore
 Polaveno
 Polcenigo
 Polesella
 Polesine Zibello
 Poli
 Polia
 Policoro
 Polignano a Mare
 Polinago
 Polino
 Polistena
 Polizzi Generosa
 Polla
 Pollein
 Pollena Trocchia
 Pollenza
 Pollica
 Pollina
 Pollone
 Pollutri
 Polonghera
 Polpenazze del Garda
 Polverara
 Polverigi
 Pomarance
 Pomaretto
 Pomarico
 Pomaro Monferrato
 Pomarolo
 Pombia
 Pomezia
 Pomigliano d'Arco
 Pompei
 Pompeiana
 Pompiano
 Pomponesco
 Pompu
 Poncarale
 Ponderano
 Ponna
 Ponsacco
 Ponso
 Pontassieve
 Pontboset
 Pont-Canavese
 Ponte
 Ponte Buggianese
 Ponte dell'Olio
 Ponte di Legno
 Ponte di Piave
 Ponte in Valtellina
 Ponte Lambro
 Ponte nelle Alpi
 Ponte Nizza
 Ponte Nossa
 Ponte San Nicolò
 Ponte San Pietro
 Pontebba
 Pontecagnano Faiano
 Pontecchio Polesine
 Pontechianale
 Pontecorvo
 Pontecurone
 Pontedassio
 Pontedera
 Pontelandolfo
 Pontelatone
 Pontelongo
 Pontenure
 Ponteranica
 Pontestura
 Pontevico
 Pontey
 Ponti
 Ponti sul Mincio
 Pontida
 Pontinia
 Pontinvrea
 Pontirolo Nuovo
 Pontoglio
 Pontremoli
 Pont-Saint-Martin
 Ponza
 Ponzano di Fermo
 Ponzano Monferrato
 Ponzano Romano
 Ponzano Veneto
 Ponzone
 Popoli
 Poppi
 Porano
 Porcari
 Porcia
 Pordenone
 Porlezza
 Pornassio
 Porpetto 
 Portacomaro
 Portalbera
 Porte
 Porte di Rendena
 Portici
 Portico di Caserta
 Portico e San Benedetto
 Portigliola
 Porto Azzurro
 Porto Ceresio
 Porto Cesareo
 Porto Empedocle
 Porto Mantovano
 Porto Recanati
 Porto San Giorgio
 Porto Sant'Elpidio
 Porto Tolle
 Porto Torres
 Porto Valtravaglia
 Porto Viro
 Portobuffolé
 Portocannone
 Portoferraio
 Portofino
 Portogruaro
 Portomaggiore
 Portopalo di Capo Passero
 Portoscuso
 Portovenere
 Portula
 Posada
 Posina
 Positano
 Possagno
 Posta
 Posta Fibreno
 Postalesio
 Postiglione
 Postua
 Potenza
 Potenza Picena
 Pove del Grappa
 Povegliano
 Povegliano Veronese
 Poviglio
 Povoletto
 Pozzaglia Sabina
 Pozzaglio ed Uniti
 Pozzallo
 Pozzilli
 Pozzo d'Adda
 Pozzol Groppo
 Pozzolengo
 Pozzoleone
 Pozzolo Formigaro
 Pozzomaggiore
 Pozzonovo
 Pozzuoli
 Pozzuolo del Friuli
 Pozzuolo Martesana
 Prad am Stilfser Joch
 Pradalunga
 Pradamano
 Pradleves
 Pragelato
 Prags
 Praia a Mare
 Praiano
 Pralboino
 Prali
 Pralormo
 Pralungo
 Pramaggiore
 Pramollo
 Prarolo
 Prarostino
 Prasco
 Prascorsano
 Prata Camportaccio
 Prata d'Ansidonia
 Prata di Pordenone
 Prata di Principato Ultra
 Prata Sannita
 Pratella
 Pratiglione
 Prato
 Prato Carnico
 Prato Sesia
 Pratola Peligna
 Pratola Serra
 Pratovecchio Stia
 Pravisdomini
 Pray
 Prazzo
 Precenicco
 Preci
 Predaia
 Predappio
 Predazzo
 Predore
 Predosa
 Preganziol
 Pregnana Milanese
 Prelà
 Premana
 Premariacco
 Premeno
 Premia
 Premilcuore
 Premolo
 Premosello-Chiovenda
 Preone 
 Prepotto
 Pré-Saint-Didier
 Preseglie
 Presenzano
 Presezzo
 Presicce
 Pressana
 Pretoro
 Prettau
 Prevalle
 Prezza
 Priero
 Prignano Cilento
 Prignano sulla Secchia
 Primaluna
 Primiero San Martino di Castrozza
 Priocca
 Priola
 Priolo Gargallo
 Priverno
 Prizzi
 Proceno
 Procida
 Propata
 Proserpio
 Prossedi
 Provaglio d'Iseo
 Provaglio Val Sabbia
 Proveis
 Provvidenti
 Prunetto
 Puegnago sul Garda
 Puglianello
 Pula
 Pulfero
 Pulsano
 Pumenengo
 Pusiano
 Putifigari
 Putignano

Q

 Quadrelle
 Quadri
 Quagliuzzo
 Qualiano
 Quaranti
 Quaregna Cerreto
 Quargnento
 Quarna Sopra
 Quarna Sotto
 Quarona
 Quarrata
 Quart
 Quarto
 Quarto d'Altino
 Quartu Sant'Elena
 Quartucciu
 Quassolo
 Quattordio
 Quattro Castella
 Quero Vas
 Quiliano
 Quincinetto
 Quindici
 Quingentole
 Quintano
 Quinto di Treviso
 Quinto Vercellese
 Quinto Vicentino
 Quinzano d'Oglio
 Quistello

R

 Rabbi
 Racale
 Racalmuto
 Racconigi
 Raccuja
 Radda in Chianti
 Raddusa
 Radicofani
 Radicondoli
 Raffadali
 Ragalna
 Ragogna
 Ragoli
 Ragusa
 Raiano
 Ramacca
 Rancio Valcuvia
 Ranco
 Randazzo
 Ranica
 Ranzanico
 Ranzo
 Rapagnano
 Rapallo
 Rapino
 Rapolano Terme
 Rapolla
 Rapone
 Rasen-Antholz
 Rassa
 Rasura
 Ratschings
 Ravanusa
 Ravarino
 Ravascletto
 Ravello
 Ravenna
 Raveo
 Raviscanina
 Re
 Rea
 Realmonte
 Reana del Rojale
 Reano
 Recale
 Recanati
 Recco
 Recetto
 Recoaro Terme
 Redavalle
 Redondesco
 Refrancore
 Refrontolo
 Regalbuto
 Reggello
 Reggio Calabria
 Reggio Emilia
 Reggiolo
 Reino
 Reitano
 Remanzacco
 Remedello
 Renate
 Rende
 Resana
 Rescaldina
 Resia
 Resiutta
 Resuttano
 Retorbido
 Revello
 Revigliasco d'Asti
 Revine Lago
 Revò
 Rezzago
 Rezzato
 Rezzo
 Rezzoaglio
 Rhêmes-Notre-Dame
 Rhêmes-Saint-Georges
 Rho
 Riace
 Rialto
 Riano
 Riardo
 Ribera
 Ribordone
 Ricadi
 Ricaldone
 Riccia
 Riccione
 Riccò del Golfo di Spezia
 Ricengo
 Ricigliano
 Riese Pio X
 Riesi
 Rieti
 Riffian
 Rifreddo
 Rignano Flaminio
 Rignano Garganico
 Rignano sull'Arno
 Rigolato 
 Rimella
 Rimini
 Rio
 Rio Saliceto
 Riofreddo
 Riola Sardo
 Riolo Terme
 Riolunato
 Riomaggiore
 Rionero in Vulture
 Rionero Sannitico
 Ripa Teatina
 Ripabottoni
 Ripacandida
 Ripalimosani
 Ripalta Arpina
 Ripalta Cremasca
 Ripalta Guerina
 Riparbella
 Ripatransone
 Ripe San Ginesio
 Ripi
 Riposto
 Rittana
 Ritten
 Riva del Garda
 Riva di Solto
 Riva Ligure
 Riva presso Chieri
 Rivalba
 Rivalta Bormida
 Rivalta di Torino
 Rivamonte Agordino
 Rivanazzano Terme
 Rivara
 Rivarolo Canavese
 Rivarolo del Re ed Uniti
 Rivarolo Mantovano
 Rivarone
 Rivarossa
 Rive
 Rive d'Arcano
 Rivello
 Rivergaro
 Rivignano Teor
 Rivisondoli
 Rivodutri
 Rivoli
 Rivoli Veronese
 Rivolta d'Adda
 Rizziconi
 Riva del Po
 Roana
 Roaschia
 Roascio
 Roasio
 Roatto
 Robassomero
 Robbiate
 Robbio
 Robecchetto con Induno
 Robecco d'Oglio
 Robecco Pavese
 Robecco sul Naviglio
 Robella
 Robilante
 Roburent
 Rocca Canavese
 Rocca Canterano
 Rocca Cigliè
 Rocca d'Arazzo
 Rocca d'Arce
 Rocca de' Baldi
 Rocca de' Giorgi
 Rocca d'Evandro
 Rocca di Botte
 Rocca di Cambio
 Rocca di Cave
 Rocca di Mezzo
 Rocca di Neto
 Rocca di Papa
 Rocca Grimalda
 Rocca Imperiale
 Rocca Massima
 Rocca Pia
 Rocca Pietore
 Rocca Priora
 Rocca San Casciano
 Rocca San Felice
 Rocca San Giovanni
 Rocca Santa Maria
 Rocca Santo Stefano
 Rocca Sinibalda
 Rocca Susella
 Roccabascerana
 Roccabernarda
 Roccabianca
 Roccabruna
 Roccacasale
 Roccadaspide
 Roccafiorita
 Roccafluvione
 Roccaforte del Greco
 Roccaforte Ligure
 Roccaforte Mondovì
 Roccaforzata
 Roccafranca
 Roccagiovine
 Roccagloriosa
 Roccagorga
 Roccalbegna
 Roccalumera
 Roccamandolfi
 Roccamena
 Roccamonfina
 Roccamontepiano
 Roccamorice
 Roccanova
 Roccantica
 Roccapalumba
 Roccapiemonte
 Roccarainola
 Roccaraso
 Roccaromana
 Roccascalegna
 Roccasecca
 Roccasecca dei Volsci
 Roccasicura
 Roccasparvera
 Roccaspinalveti
 Roccastrada
 Roccavaldina
 Roccaverano
 Roccavignale
 Roccavione
 Roccavivara
 Roccella Ionica
 Roccella Valdemone
 Rocchetta a Volturno
 Rocchetta Belbo
 Rocchetta di Vara
 Rocchetta e Croce
 Rocchetta Ligure
 Rocchetta Nervina
 Rocchetta Palafea
 Rocchetta Sant'Antonio
 Rocchetta Tanaro
 Rodano
 Roddi
 Roddino
 Rodello
 Rodeneck
 Rodengo-Saiano
 Rodero
 Rodi Garganico
 Rodì Milici
 Rodigo
 Roè Volciano
 Rofrano
 Rogeno
 Roggiano Gravina
 Roghudi
 Rogliano
 Rognano
 Rogno
 Rogolo
 Roiate
 Roio del Sangro
 Roisan
 Roletto
 Rolo
 Romagnano al Monte
 Romagnano Sesia
 Romagnese
 Romallo
 Romana
 Romanengo
 Romano Canavese
 Romano d'Ezzelino
 Romano di Lombardia
 Romans d'Isonzo
 Rombiolo
 Rome
 Romeno
 Romentino
 Rometta
 Ronago
 Roncà
 Roncade
 Roncadelle
 Roncaro
 Roncegno Terme
 Roncello
 Ronchi dei Legionari
 Ronchi Valsugana
 Ronchis
 Ronciglione
 Ronco all'Adige
 Ronco Biellese
 Ronco Briantino
 Ronco Canavese
 Ronco Scrivia
 Roncobello
 Roncoferraro
 Roncofreddo
 Roncola
 Rondanina
 Rondissone
 Ronsecco
 Ronzo-Chienis
 Ronzone
 Roppolo
 Rorà
 Rosà
 Rosarno
 Rosasco
 Rosate
 Rosazza
 Rosciano
 Roscigno
 Rose
 Rosello
 Roseto Capo Spulico
 Roseto degli Abruzzi
 Roseto Valfortore
 Rosignano Marittimo
 Rosignano Monferrato
 Rosolina
 Rosolini
 Rosora
 Rossa
 Rossana 
 Rossano Veneto
 Rossiglione
 Rosta
 Rota d'Imagna
 Rota Greca
 Rotella
 Rotello
 Rotonda
 Rotondella
 Rotondi
 Rottofreno
 Rotzo
 Roure
 Rovasenda
 Rovato
 Rovegno
 Rovellasca
 Rovello Porro
 Roverbella
 Roverchiara
 Roverè della Luna
 Roverè Veronese
 Roveredo di Guà
 Roveredo in Piano
 Rovereto
 Rovescala
 Rovetta
 Roviano
 Rovigo
 Rovito
 Rovolon
 Rozzano
 Rubano
 Rubiana
 Rubiera
 Ruda
 Rudiano
 Rueglio
 Ruffano
 Ruffia
 Ruffrè-Mendola
 Rufina
 Ruinas
 Rumo
 Ruoti
 Russi
 Rutigliano
 Rutino
 Ruviano
 Ruvo del Monte
 Ruvo di Puglia

S

 Sabaudia
 Sabbio Chiese
 Sabbioneta
 Sacco
 Saccolongo
 Sacile
 Sacrofano
 Sadali
 Sagama
 Sagliano Micca
 Sagrado
 Sagron Mis
 Saint-Christophe
 Saint-Denis
 Saint-Marcel
 Saint-Nicolas
 Saint-Oyen
 Saint-Pierre
 Saint-Rhémy-en-Bosses
 Saint-Vincent
 Sala Baganza
 Sala Biellese
 Sala Bolognese
 Sala Comacina
 Sala Consilina
 Sala Monferrato
 Salandra
 Salaparuta
 Salara
 Salasco
 Salassa
 Salbertrand
 Salcedo
 Salcito
 Sale
 Sale delle Langhe
 Sale Marasino
 Sale San Giovanni
 Salemi
 Salento
 Salerano Canavese
 Salerano sul Lambro
 Salerno
 Salgareda
 Sali Vercellese
 Salice Salentino
 Saliceto
 Salisano
 Salizzole
 Salle
 Salmour
 Salò
 Salorno
 Salsomaggiore Terme
 Saltrio
 Saludecio
 Saluggia
 Salussola
 Saluzzo
 Salve
 Salvirola
 Salvitelle
 Salza di Pinerolo
 Salza Irpina
 Salzano
 Samarate
 Samassi
 Samatzai
 Sambuca di Sicilia
 Sambuca Pistoiese
 Sambuci
 Sambuco
 Sammichele di Bari
 Samo
 Samolaco
 Samone (Province of Trento)
 Samone (Province of Turin)
 Sampeyre
 Samugheo
 San Bartolomeo al Mare
 San Bartolomeo in Galdo
 San Bartolomeo Val Cavargna
 San Basile
 San Basilio
 San Bassano
 San Bellino
 San Benedetto Belbo
 San Benedetto dei Marsi
 San Benedetto del Tronto
 San Benedetto in Perillis
 San Benedetto Po
 San Benedetto Ullano
 San Benedetto Val di Sambro
 San Benigno Canavese
 San Bernardino Verbano
 San Biagio della Cima
 San Biagio di Callalta
 San Biagio Platani
 San Biagio Saracinisco
 San Biase
 San Bonifacio
 San Buono
 San Calogero
 San Canzian d'Isonzo
 San Carlo Canavese
 San Casciano dei Bagni
 San Casciano in Val di Pesa
 San Cassiano
 San Cataldo
 San Cesareo
 San Cesario di Lecce
 San Cesario sul Panaro
 San Chirico Nuovo
 San Chirico Raparo
 San Cipirello
 San Cipriano d'Aversa
 San Cipriano Picentino
 San Cipriano Po
 San Clemente
 San Colombano al Lambro
 San Colombano Belmonte
 San Colombano Certénoli
 San Cono
 San Cosmo Albanese
 San Costantino Albanese
 San Costantino Calabro
 San Costanzo
 San Cristoforo
 San Damiano al Colle
 San Damiano d'Asti
 San Damiano Macra
 San Daniele del Friuli
 San Daniele Po
 San Demetrio Corone
 San Demetrio ne' Vestini
 San Didero
 San Donà di Piave
 San Donaci
 San Donato di Lecce
 San Donato di Ninea
 San Donato Milanese
 San Donato Val di Comino
 San Dorligo della Valle
 San Fele
 San Felice a Cancello
 San Felice Circeo
 San Felice del Benaco
 San Felice del Molise
 San Felice sul Panaro
 San Ferdinando
 San Ferdinando di Puglia
 San Fermo della Battaglia
 San Fili
 San Filippo del Mela
 San Fior
 San Fiorano
 San Floriano del Collio
 San Floro
 San Francesco al Campo
 San Fratello
 San Gavino Monreale
 San Gemini
 San Genesio ed Uniti
 San Gennaro Vesuviano
 San Germano Chisone
 San Germano Vercellese
 San Gervasio Bresciano
 San Giacomo degli Schiavoni
 San Giacomo delle Segnate
 San Giacomo Filippo
 San Giacomo Vercellese
 San Gillio
 San Gimignano
 San Ginesio
 San Giorgio a Cremano
 San Giorgio a Liri
 San Giorgio Albanese
 San Giorgio Canavese
 San Giorgio del Sannio
 San Giorgio della Richinvelda
 San Giorgio delle Pertiche
 San Giorgio di Lomellina
 San Giorgio Bigarello
 San Giorgio di Nogaro
 San Giorgio di Piano
 San Giorgio in Bosco
 San Giorgio Ionico
 San Giorgio La Molara
 San Giorgio Lucano
 San Giorgio Monferrato
 San Giorgio Morgeto
 San Giorgio Piacentino
 San Giorgio Scarampi
 San Giorgio su Legnano
 San Giorio di Susa
 San Giovanni a Piro
 San Giovanni al Natisone
 San Giovanni Bianco
 San Giovanni del Dosso
 San Giovanni di Gerace
 San Giovanni Gemini
 San Giovanni Ilarione
 San Giovanni in Croce
 San Giovanni in Fiore
 San Giovanni in Galdo
 San Giovanni in Marignano
 San Giovanni in Persiceto
 San Giovanni Incarico
 San Giovanni la Punta
 San Giovanni Lipioni
 San Giovanni Lupatoto
 San Giovanni Rotondo
 San Giovanni Suergiu
 San Giovanni Teatino
 San Giovanni Valdarno
 San Giuliano del Sannio
 San Giuliano di Puglia
 San Giuliano Milanese
 San Giuliano Terme
 San Giuseppe Jato
 San Giuseppe Vesuviano
 San Giustino
 San Giusto Canavese
 San Godenzo
 San Gregorio da Sassola
 San Gregorio di Catania
 San Gregorio d'Ippona
 San Gregorio Magno
 San Gregorio Matese
 San Gregorio nelle Alpi
 San Lazzaro di Savena
 San Leo
 San Leonardo
 San Leucio del Sannio
 San Lorenzello
 San Lorenzo
 San Lorenzo al Mare
 San Lorenzo Bellizzi
 San Lorenzo del Vallo
 San Lorenzo Dorsino
 San Lorenzo in Campo
 San Lorenzo Isontino
 San Lorenzo Maggiore
 San Lorenzo Nuovo
 San Luca
 San Lucido
 San Lupo
 San Mango d'Aquino
 San Mango Piemonte
 San Mango sul Calore
 San Marcellino
 San Marcello
 San Marcello Piteglio
 San Marco Argentano
 San Marco d'Alunzio
 San Marco dei Cavoti
 San Marco Evangelista
 San Marco in Lamis
 San Marco la Catola
 San Martin de Tor
 San Martino al Tagliamento
 San Martino Alfieri
 San Martino Buon Albergo
 San Martino Canavese
 San Martino d'Agri
 San Martino dall'Argine
 San Martino del Lago
 San Martino di Finita
 San Martino di Lupari
 San Martino di Venezze
 San Martino in Pensilis
 San Martino in Rio
 San Martino in Strada
 San Martino Sannita
 San Martino Siccomario
 San Martino sulla Marrucina
 San Martino Valle Caudina
 San Marzano di San Giuseppe
 San Marzano Oliveto
 San Marzano sul Sarno
 San Massimo
 San Maurizio Canavese
 San Maurizio d'Opaglio
 San Mauro Castelverde
 San Mauro Cilento
 San Mauro di Saline
 San Mauro Forte
 San Mauro la Bruca
 San Mauro Marchesato
 San Mauro Pascoli
 San Mauro Torinese
 San Michele al Tagliamento
 San Michele all'Adige
 San Michele di Ganzaria
 San Michele di Serino
 San Michele Mondovì
 San Michele Salentino
 San Miniato
 San Nazario
 San Nazzaro
 San Nazzaro Sesia
 San Nazzaro Val Cavargna
 San Nicandro Garganico
 San Nicola Arcella
 San Nicola Baronia
 San Nicola da Crissa
 San Nicola dell'Alto
 San Nicola la Strada
 San Nicola Manfredi
 San Nicolò d'Arcidano
 San Nicolò di Comelico
 San Nicolò Gerrei
 San Pancrazio Salentino
 San Paolo
 San Paolo Albanese
 San Paolo Bel Sito
 San Paolo d'Argon
 San Paolo di Civitate
 San Paolo di Jesi
 San Paolo Solbrito
 San Pellegrino Terme
 San Pier d'Isonzo
 San Pier Niceto
 San Piero Patti
 San Pietro a Maida
 San Pietro al Natisone
 San Pietro al Tanagro
 San Pietro Apostolo
 San Pietro Avellana
 San Pietro Clarenza
 San Pietro di Cadore
 San Pietro di Caridà
 San Pietro di Feletto
 San Pietro di Morubio
 San Pietro in Amantea
 San Pietro in Cariano
 San Pietro in Casale
 San Pietro in Cerro
 San Pietro in Gu
 San Pietro in Guarano
 San Pietro in Lama
 San Pietro Infine
 San Pietro Mosezzo
 San Pietro Mussolino
 San Pietro Val Lemina
 San Pietro Vernotico
 San Pietro Viminario
 San Pio delle Camere
 San Polo dei Cavalieri
 San Polo d'Enza
 San Polo di Piave
 San Polo Matese
 San Ponso
 San Possidonio
 San Potito Sannitico
 San Potito Ultra
 San Prisco
 San Procopio
 San Prospero
 San Quirico d'Orcia
 San Quirino
 San Raffaele Cimena
 San Roberto
 San Rocco al Porto
 San Romano in Garfagnana
 San Rufo
 San Salvatore di Fitalia
 San Salvatore Monferrato
 San Salvatore Telesino
 San Salvo
 San Sebastiano al Vesuvio
 San Sebastiano Curone
 San Sebastiano da Po
 San Secondo di Pinerolo
 San Secondo Parmense
 San Severino Lucano
 San Severino Marche
 San Severo
 San Siro
 San Sossio Baronia
 San Sostene
 San Sosti
 San Sperate
 San Tammaro
 San Teodoro (Province of Messina)
 San Teodoro (Province of Olbia-Tempio)
 San Tomaso Agordino
 San Valentino in Abruzzo Citeriore
 San Valentino Torio
 San Venanzo
 San Vendemiano
 San Vero Milis
 San Vincenzo
 San Vincenzo La Costa
 San Vincenzo Valle Roveto
 San Vitaliano
 San Vito
 San Vito al Tagliamento
 San Vito al Torre
 San Vito Chietino
 San Vito dei Normanni
 San Vito di Cadore
 San Vito di Fagagna
 San Vito di Leguzzano
 San Vito Lo Capo
 San Vito Romano
 San Vito sullo Ionio
 San Vittore del Lazio
 San Vittore Olona
 San Zeno di Montagna
 San Zeno Naviglio
 San Zenone al Lambro
 San Zenone al Po
 San Zenone degli Ezzelini
 Sanarica
 Sand in Taufers
 Sandigliano
 Sandrigo
 Sanfrè
 Sanfront
 Sangano
 Sangiano
 Sangineto
 Sanguinetto
 Sanluri
 Sannazzaro de' Burgondi
 Sannicandro di Bari
 Sannicola
 Sanremo
 Sansepolcro
 Santa Brigida
 Santa Caterina Albanese
 Santa Caterina dello Ionio
 Santa Caterina Villarmosa
 Santa Cesarea Terme
 Santa Crestina Gherdëina
 Santa Cristina d'Aspromonte
 Santa Cristina e Bissone
 Santa Cristina Gela
 Santa Croce Camerina
 Santa Croce del Sannio
 Santa Croce di Magliano
 Santa Croce sull'Arno
 Santa Domenica Talao
 Santa Domenica Vittoria
 Santa Elisabetta
 Santa Fiora
 Santa Flavia
 Santa Giuletta
 Santa Giusta
 Santa Giustina
 Santa Giustina in Colle
 Santa Luce
 Santa Lucia del Mela
 Santa Lucia di Piave
 Santa Lucia di Serino
 Santa Margherita di Belice
 Santa Margherita di Staffora
 Santa Margherita Ligure
 Santa Maria a Monte
 Santa Maria a Vico
 Santa Maria Capua Vetere
 Santa Maria Coghinas
 Santa Maria del Cedro
 Santa Maria del Molise
 Santa Maria della Versa
 Santa Maria di Licodia
 Santa Maria di Sala
 Santa Maria Hoè
 Santa Maria Imbaro
 Santa Maria la Carità
 Santa Maria la Fossa
 Santa Maria la Longa
 Santa Maria Maggiore
 Santa Maria Nuova
 Santa Marina
 Santa Marina Salina
 Santa Marinella
 Santa Ninfa
 Santa Paolina
 Santa Severina
 Santa Sofia
 Santa Sofia d'Epiro
 Santa Teresa di Riva
 Santa Teresa Gallura
 Santa Venerina
 Santa Vittoria d'Alba
 Santa Vittoria in Matenano
 Santadi
 Sant'Agapito
 Sant'Agata Bolognese
 Sant'Agata de' Goti
 Sant'Agata del Bianco
 Sant'Agata di Esaro
 Sant'Agata di Militello
 Sant'Agata di Puglia
 Sant'Agata Feltria
 Sant'Agata Fossili
 Sant'Agata li Battiati
 Sant'Agata sul Santerno
 Sant'Agnello 
 Sant'Albano Stura
 Sant'Alessio con Vialone
 Sant'Alessio in Aspromonte
 Sant'Alessio Siculo
 Sant'Alfio
 Sant'Ambrogio di Torino
 Sant'Ambrogio di Valpolicella
 Sant'Ambrogio sul Garigliano
 Sant'Anastasia
 Sant'Anatolia di Narco
 Sant'Andrea Apostolo dello Ionio
 Sant'Andrea del Garigliano
 Sant'Andrea di Conza
 Sant'Andrea Frius
 Sant'Angelo a Cupolo
 Sant'Angelo a Fasanella
 Sant'Angelo a Scala
 Sant'Angelo all'Esca
 Sant'Angelo d'Alife
 Sant'Angelo dei Lombardi
 Sant'Angelo del Pesco
 Sant'Angelo di Brolo
 Sant'Angelo di Piove di Sacco
 Sant'Angelo in Pontano
 Sant'Angelo in Vado
 Sant'Angelo Le Fratte
 Sant'Angelo Limosano
 Sant'Angelo Lodigiano
 Sant'Angelo Lomellina
 Sant'Angelo Muxaro
 Sant'Angelo Romano
 Sant'Anna Arresi
 Sant'Anna d'Alfaedo
 Sant'Antimo
 Sant'Antioco
 Sant'Antonino di Susa
 Sant'Antonio Abate
 Sant'Antonio di Gallura
 Sant'Apollinare
 Sant'Arcangelo
 Santarcangelo di Romagna
 Sant'Arcangelo Trimonte
 Sant'Arpino
 Sant'Arsenio
 Sante Marie
 Sant'Egidio alla Vibrata
 Sant'Egidio del Monte Albino
 Sant'Elena
 Sant'Elena Sannita
 Sant'Elia a Pianisi
 Sant'Elia Fiumerapido
 Sant'Elpidio a Mare
 Santena
 Santeramo in Colle
 Sant'Eufemia a Maiella
 Sant'Eufemia d'Aspromonte
 Sant'Eusanio del Sangro
 Sant'Eusanio Forconese
 Santhià
 Santi Cosma e Damiano
 Sant'Ilario dello Ionio
 Sant'Ilario d'Enza
 Sant'Ippolito
 Santo Stefano al Mare
 Santo Stefano Belbo
 Santo Stefano d'Aveto
 Santo Stefano del Sole
 Santo Stefano di Cadore
 Santo Stefano di Camastra
 Santo Stefano di Magra
 Santo Stefano di Rogliano
 Santo Stefano di Sessanio
 Santo Stefano in Aspromonte
 Santo Stefano Lodigiano
 Santo Stefano Quisquina
 Santo Stefano Roero
 Santo Stefano Ticino
 Santo Stino di Livenza
 Sant'Olcese
 Santomenna
 Sant'Omero
 Sant'Omobono Terme
 Sant'Onofrio
 Santopadre
 Sant'Oreste
 Santorso
 Sant'Orsola Terme
 Santu Lussurgiu
 Sant'Urbano
 Sanza
 Sanzeno
 Saonara
 Saponara
 Sappada
 Sapri
 Saracena
 Saracinesco
 Sarcedo
 Sarconi
 Sardara
 Sardigliano
 Sarego
 Sarezzano
 Sarezzo
 Sarmato
 Sarmede
 Sarnano
 Sarnico
 Sarno
 Sarnonico
 Sarntal
 Saronno
 Sarre
 Sarroch
 Sarsina
 Sarteano
 Sartirana Lomellina
 Sarule
 Sarzana
 Sassano
 Sassari
 Sassello
 Sassetta
 Sassinoro
 Sasso di Castalda
 Sasso Marconi
 Sassocorvaro Auditore
 Sassofeltrio
 Sassoferrato
 Sassuolo
 Satriano
 Satriano di Lucania
 Sauris
 Sauze di Cesana
 Sauze d'Oulx
 Sava
 Savelli
 Saviano
 Savigliano
 Savignano Irpino
 Savignano sul Panaro
 Savignano sul Rubicone 
 Savignone
 Saviore dell'Adamello
 Savoca
 Savogna
 Savogna d'Isonzo
 Savoia di Lucania
 Savona
 Scafa
 Scafati
 Scagnello
 Scala
 Scala Coeli
 Scaldasole
 Scalea
 Scalenghe
 Scaletta Zanclea
 Scampitella
 Scandale
 Scandiano
 Scandicci
 Scandolara Ravara
 Scandolara Ripa d'Oglio
 Scandriglia
 Scanno
 Scano di Montiferro
 Scansano
 Scanzano Jonico
 Scanzorosciate
 Scapoli
 Scarlino
 Scarmagno
 Scarnafigi
 Scarperia e San Piero
 Scerni
 Scheggia e Pascelupo
 Scheggino
 Schenna
 Schiavi di Abruzzo
 Schiavon
 Schignano
 Schilpario
 Schio
 Schivenoglia
 Schlanders
 Schluderns
 Schnals
 Sciacca
 Sciara
 Scicli
 Scido
 Scigliano
 Scilla
 Scillato
 Sciolze
 Scisciano
 Sclafani Bagni
 Scontrone
 Scopa
 Scopello
 Scoppito
 Scordia
 Scorrano
 Scorzè
 Scurcola Marsicana
 Scurelle
 Scurzolengo
 Seborga
 Secinaro
 Seclì
 Secugnago
 Sedegliano
 Sedico
 Sedilo
 Sedini
 Sedriano
 Sedrina
 Sefro
 Segariu
 Seggiano
 Segni
 Segonzano
 Segrate
 Segusino
 Selargius
 Selci
 Selegas
 Sella Giudicarie
 Sellano
 Sellero
 Sellia
 Sellia Marina
 Sëlva
 Selva di Cadore
 Selva di Progno
 Selvazzano Dentro
 Selvino
 Semestene
 Semiana
 Seminara
 Semproniano
 Senago
 Seneghe
 Senerchia
 Seniga
 Senigallia
 Senis
 Senise
 Sèn Jan di Fassa
 Senna Comasco
 Senna Lodigiana
 Sennariolo
 Sennori
 Senorbì
 Sepino
 Sequals
 Seravezza
 Serdiana
 Seregno
 Seren del Grappa
 Sergnano
 Seriate
 Serina
 Serino
 Serle
 Sermide e Felonica
 Sermoneta
 Sernaglia della Battaglia
 Sernio
 Serole
 Serra d'Aiello
 Serra de' Conti
 Serra Riccò
 Serra San Bruno
 Serra San Quirico
 Serra Sant'Abbondio
 Serracapriola
 Serradifalco
 Serralunga d'Alba
 Serralunga di Crea
 Serramanna
 Serramazzoni
 Serramezzana
 Serramonacesca
 Serrapetrona
 Serrara Fontana
 Serrastretta
 Serrata
 Serravalle a Po
 Serravalle di Chienti
 Serravalle Langhe
 Serravalle Pistoiese
 Serravalle Scrivia
 Serravalle Sesia
 Serre
 Serrenti
 Serri
 Serrone
 Sersale
 Servigliano
 Sessa Aurunca
 Sessa Cilento
 Sessame
 Sessano del Molise
 Sesta Godano
 Sestino
 Sesto al Reghena
 Sesto Calende
 Sesto Campano
 Sesto ed Uniti
 Sesto Fiorentino
 Sesto San Giovanni
 Sestola
 Sestri Levante
 Sestriere
 Sestu
 Settala
 Settefrati
 Settime
 Settimo Milanese
 Settimo Rottaro
 Settimo San Pietro
 Settimo Torinese
 Settimo Vittone
 Settingiano
 Setzu
 Seui
 Seulo
 Seveso
 Sexten
 Sezzadio
 Sezze
 Sfruz
 Sgonico
 Sgurgola
 Siamaggiore
 Siamanna
 Siano
 Siapiccia
 Sicignano degli Alburni
 Siculiana
 Siddi
 Siderno
 Siena
 Sigillo
 Signa
 Silanus
 Silea
 Siligo
 Siliqua
 Silius
 Sillano Giuncugnano
 Sillavengo
 Silvano d'Orba
 Silvano Pietra
 Silvi
 Simala
 Simaxis
 Simbario
 Simeri Crichi
 Sinagra
 Sinalunga
 Sindia
 Sini
 Sinio
 Siniscola
 Sinnai
 Sinopoli
 Sirignano
 Siris
 Sirmione
 Sirolo
 Sirone
 Sirtori
 Sissa Trecasali
 Siurgus Donigala
 Siziano
 Sizzano
 Smerillo
 Soave
 Socchieve
 Soddì
 Sogliano al Rubicone
 Sogliano Cavour
 Soglio
 Soiano del Lago
 Solagna
 Solarino
 Solaro
 Solarolo
 Solarolo Rainerio
 Solarussa
 Solbiate con Cagno
 Solbiate Arno
 Solbiate Olona
 Soldano
 Soleminis
 Solero
 Solesino
 Soleto
 Solferino
 Soliera
 Solignano
 Solofra
 Solonghello
 Solopaca
 Solto Collina
 Solza
 Somaglia
 Somano
 Somma Lombardo
 Somma Vesuviana
 Sommacampagna
 Sommariva del Bosco
 Sommariva Perno
 Sommatino
 Sommo
 Sona
 Soncino
 Sondalo
 Sondrio
 Songavazzo
 Sonico
 Sonnino
 Sora
 Soraga di Fassa
 Soragna
 Sorano
 Sorbo San Basile
 Sorbo Serpico
 Sorbolo Mezzani
 Sordevolo
 Sordio
 Soresina
 Sorgà
 Sorgono
 Sori
 Sorianello
 Soriano Calabro
 Soriano nel Cimino
 Sorico
 Soriso
 Sorisole
 Sormano
 Sorradile
 Sorrento
 Sorso
 Sortino
 Sospiro
 Sospirolo
 Sossano
 Sostegno
 Sotto il Monte Giovanni XXIII
 Sover
 Soverato
 Sovere
 Soveria Mannelli
 Soveria Simeri
 Soverzene
 Sovicille
 Sovico
 Sovizzo
 Sovramonte
 Sozzago
 Spadafora
 Spadola
 Sparanise
 Sparone
 Specchia
 Spello
 Sperlinga
 Sperlonga
 Sperone
 Spessa
 Spezzano Albanese
 Spezzano della Sila 
 Spiazzo
 Spigno Monferrato
 Spigno Saturnia
 Spilamberto
 Spilimbergo
 Spilinga
 Spinadesco
 Spinazzola
 Spinea
 Spineda
 Spinete
 Spineto Scrivia
 Spinetoli
 Spino d'Adda
 Spinone al Lago
 Spinoso
 Spirano
 Spoleto
 Spoltore
 Spongano
 Spormaggiore
 Sporminore
 Spotorno
 Spresiano
 Spriana
 Squillace
 Squinzano
 St. Leonhard in Passeier
 St. Lorenzen
 St. Martin in Passeier
 St. Pankraz
 Staffolo
 Stagno Lombardo
 Staiti
 Stalettì
 Stanghella
 Staranzano
 Statte
 Stazzano
 Stazzema
 Stazzona
 Stefanaconi
 Stella
 Stella Cilento
 Stellanello
 Stenico
 Sternatia
 Sterzing
 Stezzano
 Stienta
 Stigliano
 Stignano
 Stilfs
 Stilo
 Stimigliano
 Stintino
 Stio
 Stornara
 Stornarella
 Storo
 Stra
 Stradella
 Strambinello
 Strambino
 Strangolagalli
 Stregna
 Strembo
 Stresa
 Strevi
 Striano
 Strona
 Stroncone
 Strongoli
 Stroppiana
 Stroppo
 Strozza
 Sturno
 Suardi
 Subbiano
 Subiaco
 Succivo
 Sueglio
 Suelli
 Suello
 Suisio
 Sulbiate
 Sulmona
 Sulzano
 Sumirago
 Summonte
 Suni
 Suno
 Supersano
 Supino
 Surano
 Surbo
 Susa
 Susegana
 Sustinente
 Sutera
 Sutri
 Sutrio
 Suvereto
 Suzzara
 Syracuse

T

 Taceno
 Tadasuni
 Taggia
 Tagliacozzo
 Taglio di Po
 Tagliolo Monferrato
 Taibon Agordino
 Taino
 Taipana
 Talamello
 Talamona
 Talana
 Taleggio
 Talla
 Talmassons
 Tambre
 Taormina
 Tarano
 Taranta Peligna
 Tarantasca
 Taranto
 Tarcento
 Tarquinia
 Tarsia
 Tartano
 Tarvisio
 Tarzo
 Tassarolo
 Taufers im Münstertal
 Taurano
 Taurasi
 Taurianova
 Taurisano
 Tavagnacco
 Tavagnasco
 Tavazzano con Villavesco
 Tavenna
 Taverna
 Tavernerio
 Tavernola Bergamasca
 Tavernole sul Mella
 Taviano
 Tavigliano
 Tavoleto
 Tavullia
 Teana
 Teano
 Teggiano
 Teglio
 Teglio Veneto
 Telese Terme
 Telgate
 Telti
 Telve
 Telve di Sopra
 Tempio Pausania
 Temù
 Tenna
 Tenno
 Teolo
 Teora
 Teramo
 Terdobbiate
 Terelle
 Terenten
 Terenzo
 Tergu
 Terlan
 Terlizzi
 Terme Vigliatore
 Termini Imerese
 Termoli
 Ternate
 Ternengo
 Terni
 Terno d'Isola
 Terracina
 Terragnolo
 Terralba
 Terranova da Sibari
 Terranova dei Passerini
 Terranova di Pollino
 Terranova Sappo Minulio
 Terranuova Bracciolini
 Terrasini
 Terrassa Padovana
 Terravecchia
 Terrazzo
 Terre d'Adige
 Terre del Reno
 Terre Roveresche
 Terricciola
 Terruggia
 Tertenia
 Terzigno
 Terzo
 Terzo d'Aquileia
 Terzolas
 Terzorio
 Tesero
 Tessennano
 Testico
 Teti
 Teulada
 Teverola
 Tezze sul Brenta
 Thiene
 Thiesi
 Tiana 
 Ticengo
 Ticineto
 Tiers
 Tiggiano
 Tiglieto
 Tigliole
 Tignale
 Tinnura
 Tione degli Abruzzi
 Tione di Trento
 Tirano
 Tiriolo
 Tirol
 Tisens
 Tissi
 Tito
 Tivoli
 Tizzano Val Parma
 Toano
 Toblach
 Tocco Caudio
 Tocco da Casauria
 Toceno
 Todi
 Toffia
 Toirano
 Tolentino
 Tolfa
 Tollegno
 Tollo
 Tolmezzo
 Tolve
 Tombolo
 Ton
 Tonara
 Tonco
 Tonengo
 Tonezza del Cimone
 Tora e Piccilli
 Torano Castello
 Torano Nuovo
 Torbole Casaglia
 Torcegno
 Torchiara
 Torchiarolo
 Torella dei Lombardi
 Torella del Sannio
 Torgiano
 Torgnon
 Torino di Sangro
 Toritto
 Torlino Vimercati
 Tornaco
 Tornareccio
 Tornata
 Tornimparte
 Torno
 Tornolo
 Toro
 Torpè
 Torraca
 Torralba
 Torrazza Coste
 Torrazza Piemonte
 Torrazzo
 Torre Annunziata
 Torre Beretti e Castellaro
 Torre Boldone
 Torre Bormida
 Torre Cajetani
 Torre Canavese
 Torre d'Arese
 Torre de' Busi
 Torre de' Negri
 Torre de' Passeri
 Torre de' Picenardi
 Torre de' Roveri
 Torre del Greco
 Torre di Mosto
 Torre di Ruggiero
 Torre di Santa Maria
 Torre d'Isola
 Torre Le Nocelle
 Torre Mondovì
 Torre Orsaia
 Torre Pallavicina
 Torre Pellice
 Torre San Giorgio
 Torre San Patrizio
 Torre Santa Susanna
 Torreano
 Torrebelvicino
 Torrebruna
 Torrecuso
 Torreglia
 Torregrotta
 Torremaggiore
 Torrenova
 Torresina
 Torretta
 Torrevecchia Pia
 Torrevecchia Teatina
 Torri del Benaco
 Torri di Quartesolo
 Torri in Sabina
 Torrice
 Torricella
 Torricella del Pizzo
 Torricella in Sabina
 Torricella Peligna
 Torricella Sicura
 Torricella Verzate
 Torriglia
 Torrile
 Torrioni
 Torrita di Siena
 Torrita Tiberina
 Tortolì
 Tortona
 Tortora
 Tortorella
 Tortoreto
 Tortorici
 Torviscosa
 Toscolano-Maderno
 Tossicia
 Tovo di Sant'Agata
 Tovo San Giacomo
 Trabia
 Tradate
 Tramatza
 Trambileno
 Tramin an der Weinstraße
 Tramonti
 Tramonti di Sopra
 Tramonti di Sotto
 Tramutola
 Trana
 Trani
 Traona
 Trapani
 Trappeto
 Trarego Viggiona
 Trasacco
 Trasaghis
 Trasquera
 Tratalias
 Travacò Siccomario
 Travagliato
 Travedona-Monate
 Traversella
 Traversetolo
 Traves
 Travesio
 Travo
 Trebaseleghe
 Trebisacce
 Trecase
 Trecastagni
 Trecastelli
 Trecate
 Trecchina
 Trecenta
 Tredozio
 Treglio
 Tregnago
 Treia
 Treiso
 Tremestieri Etneo
 Tremezzina
 Tremiti Islands
 Tremosine sul Garda
 Trentinara
 Trento
 Trentola-Ducenta
 Trenzano
 Treppo Grande
 Treppo Ligosullo
 Trepuzzi
 Trequanda
 Tresana
 Trescore Balneario
 Trescore Cremasco
 Tresignana
 Tresivio
 Tresnuraghes
 Trevenzuolo
 Trevi
 Trevi nel Lazio
 Trevico
 Treviglio
 Trevignano
 Trevignano Romano
 Treville
 Treviolo
 Treviso
 Treviso Bresciano
 Trezzano Rosa
 Trezzano sul Naviglio
 Trezzo sull'Adda
 Trezzo Tinella
 Trezzone
 Tre Ville
 Tribano
 Tribiano
 Tribogna
 Tricarico
 Tricase
 Tricerro
 Tricesimo
 Trichiana
 Triei
 Trieste
 Triggiano
 Trigolo
 Trinità
 Trinità d'Agultu e Vignola
 Trinitapoli
 Trino
 Triora
 Tripi
 Trisobbio
 Trissino
 Triuggio
 Trivento
 Trivigliano
 Trivignano Udinese
 Trivigno
 Trivolzio
 Trofarello
 Troia
 Troina
 Tromello
 Trontano
 Tronzano Lago Maggiore
 Tronzano Vercellese
 Tropea
 Trovo
 Truccazzano
 Truden im Naturpark
 Tscherms
 Tufara
 Tufillo
 Tufino
 Tufo
 Tuglie
 Tuili
 Tula
 Tuoro sul Trasimeno
 Turania
 Turano Lodigiano
 Turate
 Turbigo
 Turi
 Turin
 Turri
 Turriaco
 Turrivalignani
 Tursi
 Tusa
 Tuscania

U

 Ubiale Clanezzo
 Uboldo
 Ucria
 Udine
 Ugento
 Uggiano la Chiesa
 Uggiate-Trevano
 Ula Tirso
 Ulassai
 Ulten
 Umbertide
 Umbriatico
 Unsere Liebe Frau im Walde-St. Felix
 Urago d'Oglio
 Uras
 Urbana
 Urbania
 Urbe
 Urbino
 Urbisaglia
 Urgnano
 Uri
 Urtijëi
 Ururi
 Urzulei
 Uscio
 Usellus
 Usini
 Usmate Velate
 Ussana
 Ussaramanna
 Ussassai
 Usseaux
 Usseglio
 Ussita
 Ustica
 Uta
 Uzzano

V

 Vaccarizzo Albanese
 Vacone
 Vacri
 Vadena
 Vado Ligure
 Vagli Sotto
 Vaglia
 Vaglio Basilicata
 Vaglio Serra
 Vahrn
 Vaiano
 Vaiano Cremasco
 Vaie
 Vailate
 Vairano Patenora
 Vajont
 Val Brembilla
 Val della Torre
 Val di Chy
 Val di Nizza
 Val di Zoldo
 Val Liona
 Val Masino
 Val Rezzo
 Valbondione
 Valbrembo
 Valbrevenna
 Valbrona
 Valchiusa
 Valdagno
 Valdaone
 Valdastico
 Valdengo
 Valderice
 Valdidentro
 Valdieri
 Valdina
 Valdisotto
 Valdobbiadene
 Valduggia
 Valeggio
 Valeggio sul Mincio
 Valentano
 Valenza
 Valenzano
 Valera Fratta
 Valfabbrica
 Valfenera
 Valfloriana
 Valfornace
 Valfurva
 Valganna
 Valgioie
 Valgoglio
 Valgrana
 Valgreghentino
 Valgrisenche
 Valguarnera Caropepe
 Vallada Agordina
 Vallanzengo
 Vallarsa
 Vallata
 Valle Agricola
 Valle Cannobina
 Valle Castellana
 Valle dell'Angelo
 Valle di Cadore
 Valle di Maddaloni
 Valle Lomellina
 Valdilana
 Valle Salimbene
 Valle San Nicolao
 Vallebona
 Vallecorsa
 Vallecrosia
 Valledolmo
 Valledoria
 Vallefiorita
 Vallefoglia
 Vallelaghi
 Vallelonga
 Vallelunga Pratameno
 Vallemaio
 Vallepietra
 Vallerano
 Vallermosa
 Vallerotonda
 Vallesaccarda
 Valleve
 Valli del Pasubio
 Vallinfreda
 Vallio Terme
 Vallo della Lucania
 Vallo di Nera
 Vallo Torinese
 Valloriate
 Valmacca
 Valmadrera
 Valmontone
 Valmorea
 Valmozzola
 Valnegra
 Valpelline
 Valperga
 Valprato Soana
 Valsamoggia
 Valsavarenche
 Valsinni
 Valsolda
 Valstagna
 Valstrona
 Valtopina
 Valtorta
 Valtournenche
 Valva
 Valvarrone
 Valvasone Arzene
 Valverde (Province of Catania)
 Valvestino
 Vanzaghello
 Vanzago
 Vanzone con San Carlo
 Vaprio d'Adda
 Vaprio d'Agogna
 Varallo Pombia
 Varallo Sesia
 Varano Borghi
 Varano de' Melegari
 Varapodio
 Varazze
 Varco Sabino
 Varedo
 Varenna
 Varese
 Varese Ligure
 Varisella
 Varmo
 Varsi
 Varzi
 Varzo
 Vasanello
 Vasia
 Vasto
 Vastogirardi
 Vauda Canavese
 Vazzano
 Vazzola
 Vecchiano
 Vedano al Lambro
 Vedano Olona
 Vedelago
 Vedeseta
 Veduggio con Colzano
 Veggiano
 Veglie
 Veglio
 Vejano
 Veleso
 Velezzo Lomellina
 Velletri
 Vellezzo Bellini
 Velo d'Astico
 Velo Veronese
 Venafro
 Venaria Reale
 Venarotta
 Venasca
 Venaus
 Vendone
 Vendrogno
 Venegono Inferiore
 Venegono Superiore
 Venetico
 Veniano
 Venice
 Venosa
 Ventasso
 Venticano
 Ventimiglia
 Ventimiglia di Sicilia
 Ventotene
 Venzone
 Verano Brianza
 Verbania
 Verbicaro
 Vercana
 Verceia
 Vercelli
 Vercurago
 Verdellino
 Verdello
 Verderio
 Verduno
 Vergato 
 Verghereto
 Vergiate
 Vermezzo
 Vermiglio
 Vernante
 Vernasca
 Vernate
 Vernazza
 Vernio
 Vernole
 Verolanuova
 Verolavecchia
 Verolengo
 Veroli
 Verona
 Veronella
 Verrayes
 Verrès
 Verretto
 Verrone
 Verrua Po
 Verrua Savoia
 Vertemate con Minoprio
 Vertova
 Verucchio
 Vervio
 Verzegnis
 Verzino
 Verzuolo
 Vescovana
 Vescovato
 Vesime
 Vespolate
 Vessalico
 Vestenanova
 Vestignè
 Vestone
 Vetralla
 Vetto
 Vezza d'Alba
 Vezza d'Oglio
 Vezzano Ligure
 Vezzano sul Crostolo
 Vezzi Portio
 Viadana
 Viadanica
 Viagrande
 Viale
 Vialfrè
 Viano
 Viareggio
 Viarigi
 Vibo Valentia
 Vibonati
 Vicalvi
 Vicari
 Vicchio
 Vicenza
 Vico del Gargano
 Vico Equense
 Vico nel Lazio
 Vicoforte
 Vicoli
 Vicolungo
 Vicopisano
 Vicovaro
 Viddalba
 Vidigulfo
 Vidor
 Vidracco
 Vieste
 Vietri di Potenza
 Vietri sul Mare
 Viganò
 Vigano San Martino
 Vigarano Mainarda
 Vigasio
 Vigevano
 Viggianello
 Viggiano
 Viggiù
 Vighizzolo d'Este
 Vigliano Biellese
 Vigliano d'Asti
 Vignale Monferrato
 Vignanello
 Vignate
 Vignola
 Vignola-Falesina
 Vignole Borbera
 Vignolo
 Vignone
 Vigo di Cadore
 Vigodarzere
 Vigolo
 Vigolzone
 Vigone
 Vigonovo
 Vigonza
 Viguzzolo
 Villa Bartolomea
 Villa Basilica
 Villa Biscossi
 Villa Carcina
 Villa Castelli
 Villa Celiera
 Villa Collemandina
 Villa Cortese
 Villa d'Adda
 Villa d'Almè
 Villa del Bosco
 Villa del Conte
 Villa di Briano
 Villa di Chiavenna
 Villa di Serio
 Villa di Tirano
 Villa d'Ogna
 Villa Estense
 Villa Faraldi
 Villa Guardia
 Villa Lagarina
 Villa Latina
 Villa Literno
 Villa Minozzo 
 Villa San Giovanni
 Villa San Giovanni in Tuscia
 Villa San Pietro
 Villa San Secondo
 Villa Santa Lucia
 Villa Santa Lucia degli Abruzzi
 Villa Santa Maria
 Villa Sant'Angelo
 Villa Sant'Antonio
 Villa Santina
 Villa Santo Stefano
 Villa Verde
 Villabate
 Villachiara
 Villacidro
 Villadeati
 Villadose
 Villadossola
 Villafalletto
 Villafranca d'Asti
 Villafranca di Verona
 Villafranca in Lunigiana
 Villafranca Padovana
 Villafranca Piemonte
 Villafranca Sicula
 Villafranca Tirrena
 Villafrati
 Villaga
 Villagrande Strisaili
 Villalago
 Villalba
 Villalfonsina
 Villalvernia
 Villamagna
 Villamaina
 Villamar
 Villamarzana
 Villamassargia
 Villamiroglio
 Villanders
 Villanova Biellese
 Villanova Canavese
 Villanova d'Albenga
 Villanova d'Ardenghi
 Villanova d'Asti
 Villanova del Battista
 Villanova del Ghebbo
 Villanova del Sillaro
 Villanova di Camposampiero
 Villanova Marchesana
 Villanova Mondovì
 Villanova Monferrato
 Villanova Monteleone
 Villanova Solaro
 Villanova sull'Arda
 Villanova Truschedu
 Villanova Tulo
 Villanovaforru
 Villanovafranca
 Villanterio
 Villanuova sul Clisi
 Villaperuccio
 Villapiana
 Villaputzu
 Villar Dora
 Villar Focchiardo
 Villar Pellice
 Villar Perosa
 Villar San Costanzo
 Villarbasse
 Villarboit
 Villareggia
 Villaricca
 Villaromagnano
 Villarosa
 Villasalto
 Villasanta
 Villasimius
 Villasor
 Villaspeciosa
 Villastellone
 Villata
 Villaurbana
 Villavallelonga
 Villaverla
 Ville d'Anaunia
 Ville di Fiemme
 Villeneuve
 Villesse
 Villetta Barrea
 Villette
 Villimpenta
 Villnöß
 Villongo
 Villorba
 Vilminore di Scalve
 Vimercate
 Vimodrone
 Vinadio
 Vinchiaturo
 Vinchio
 Vinci
 Vinovo
 Vintl
 Vinzaglio
 Viola
 Vione 
 Virle Piemonte
 Visano
 Vische
 Visciano
 Visco
 Visone
 Visso
 Vistarino
 Vistrorio
 Vita
 Viterbo
 Viticuso
 Vito d'Asio
 Vitorchiano
 Vittoria
 Vittorio Veneto
 Vittorito
 Vittuone
 Vitulano
 Vitulazio
 Viù
 Vivaro
 Vivaro Romano
 Viverone
 Vizzini
 Vizzola Ticino
 Vizzolo Predabissi
 Vo'
 Vobarno
 Vobbia
 Vocca
 Vodo di Cadore
 Voghera
 Voghiera
 Vogogna
 Volano
 Volla
 Volongo
 Volpago del Montello
 Volpara
 Volpedo
 Volpeglino
 Volpiano
 Völs am Schlern
 Volta Mantovana
 Voltaggio
 Voltago Agordino
 Volterra
 Voltido
 Volturara Appula
 Volturara Irpina
 Volturino
 Volvera
 Vöran
 Vottignasco

W

 Waidbruck
 Welsberg-Taisten
 Welschnofen

Z

 Zaccanopoli
 Zafferana Etnea
 Zagarise
 Zagarolo
 Zambrone
 Zandobbio
 Zanè
 Zanica
 Zapponeta
 Zavattarello
 Zeccone
 Zeddiani
 Zelbio
 Zelo Buon Persico
 Zelo Surrigone
 Zeme
 Zenevredo
 Zenson di Piave
 Zerba
 Zerbo
 Zerbolò
 Zerfaliu
 Zeri
 Zermeghedo
 Zero Branco
 Zevio
 Ziano di Fiemme
 Ziano Piacentino
 Zibido San Giacomo
 Zignago
 Zimella
 Zimone
 Zinasco
 Zoagli
 Zocca
 Zogno
 Zola Predosa
 Zollino
 Zone
 Zoppè di Cadore
 Zoppola
 Zovencedo
 Zubiena
 Zuccarello 
 Zugliano
 Zuglio
 Zumaglia
 Zumpano
 Zungoli
 Zungri

See also 
 List of municipalities of Italy, by province

Notes

 *
Municipalities of Italy